= Canton of Château-Landon =

Coordinates: 48°09′01″N 2°42′09″E

Château-Landon
- Former canton
- Interactive map of Château-Landon
- Country: France
- Region: Île-de-France
- Department: Seine-et-Marne
- No. of communes: {{{nbcomm}}}
- Disbanded: 2015
- Area: 234.09 km^{2} (90.38 sq mi)
- Population (2012): 14,240
  - Density: 60.83/km^{2} (157.6/sq mi)

The canton of Château-Landon is a French former administrative division, located in the arrondissement of Fontainebleau, in the Seine-et-Marne département (Île-de-France région). It was disbanded following the French canton reorganisation which came into effect in March 2015. It consisted of 15 communes, which joined the canton of Nemours in 2015.

== Demographics ==
Historical population
Year	Pop.	±%
1999	13,700	—
2006	14,055	+2.6%
2012	14,240	+1.3%

== Composition ==
The canton of Château-Landon was composed of 15 communes:

- Arville
- Aufferville
- Beaumont-du-Gâtinais
- Bougligny
- Bransles
- Chaintreaux
- Château-Landon
- Chenou
- Gironville
- Ichy
- La Madeleine-sur-Loing
- Maisoncelles-en-Gâtinais
- Mondreville
- Obsonville
- Souppes-sur-Loing

== See also ==
- Cantons of the Seine-et-Marne department
- Communes of the Seine-et-Marne department
