= Communauté de communes de la Campagne Gâtinaise =

Coordinates: 48.139°N 2.4762°E

Campagne Gâtinaise
- Former communauté de communes
- Interactive map of Campagne Gâtinaise
- Country: France
- Region: Île-de-France
- Department: Seine-et-Marne
- No. of communes: {{{nbcomm}}}
- Established: 1973
- Disbanded: 2010
- Area: 56.46 km^{2} (21.80 sq mi)
- Population (1999): 1,557
  - Density: 27.58/km^{2} (71.42/sq mi)

The Communauté de communes de la Campagne Gâtinaise is a former federation of municipalities (communauté de communes) in the Seine-et-Marne département and in the Île-de-France région of France. It was established on 22 August 1973. It was merged into the new Communauté de communes Gâtinais-Val de Loing in January 2010.

== Composition ==
The Communauté de communes comprised the following communes:

- Arville
- Beaumont-du-Gâtinais
- Gironville
- Ichy
- Obsonville

== See also ==
- Communes of the Seine-et-Marne department
