= Châtenoy, Seine-et-Marne =

Châtenoy
- Commune
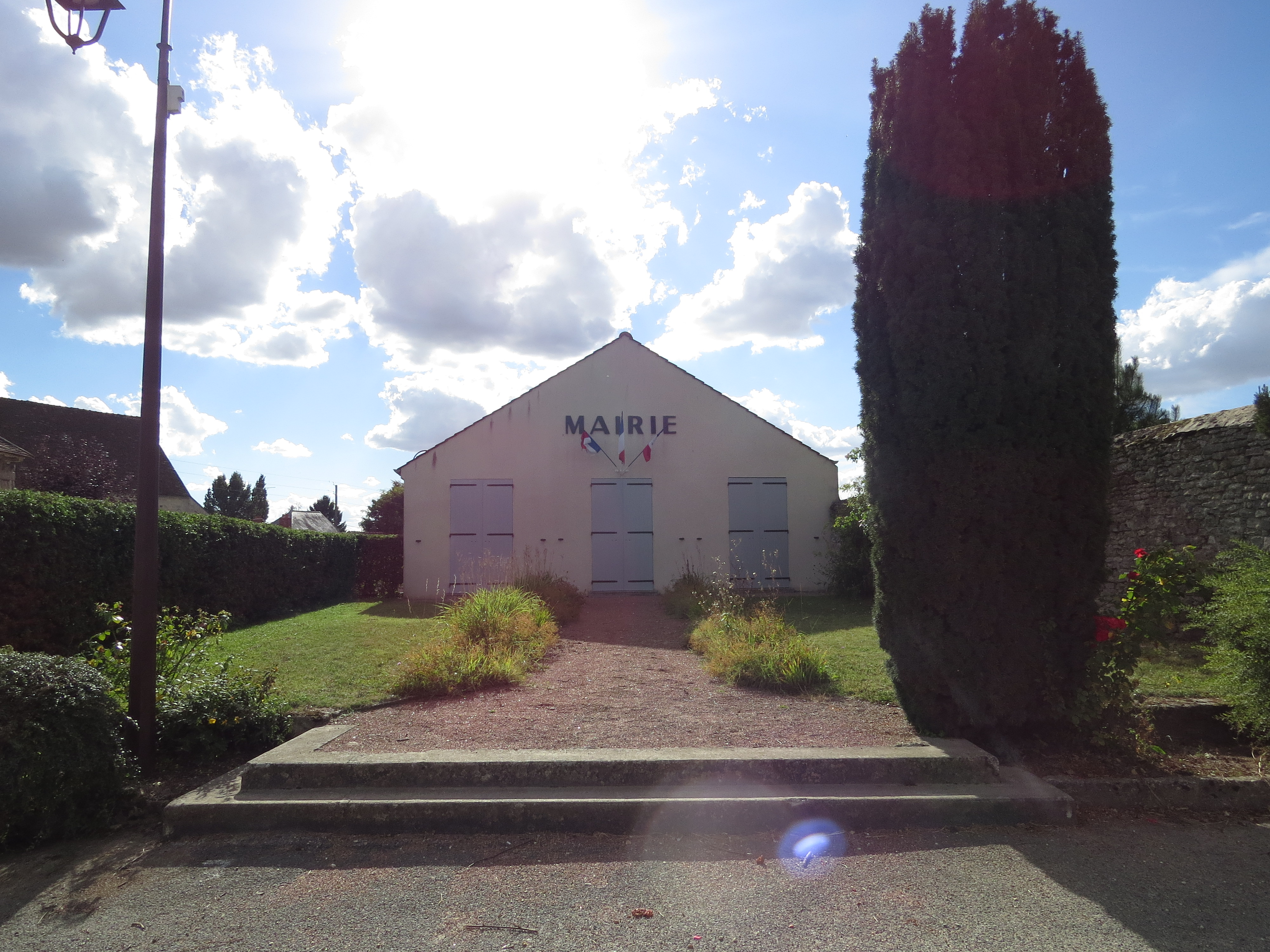
- The town hall in Châtenoy

- Coat of arms
- Location of Châtenoy
- Location within France Location within Île-de-France (region)
- Coordinates: 48°13′57″N 2°37′37″E
- Country: France
- Region: Île-de-France
- Department: Seine-et-Marne
- Arrondissement: Fontainebleau
- Canton: Nemours

Government
  - Mayor (2020–2026): Denis Céladon
- Area^{1}: 4.87 km^{2} (1.88 sq mi)
- Highest elevation: 119 m (390 ft)
- Lowest elevation: 100 m (330 ft)
- Population (2023): 155
  - Density: 31.8/km^{2} (82.4/sq mi)
- Time zone: UTC+01:00 (CET)
  - Summer (DST): UTC+02:00 (CEST)
- INSEE/Postal code: 77102 /77167
- ^{1} French Land Register data, which excludes lakes, ponds, glaciers > 1 km^{2} (0.386 sq mi or 247 acres) and river estuaries.

Châtenoy is a commune in the Seine-et-Marne department in the Île-de-France region in north-central France.

== Demographics ==
As of 2023, the population of the commune was 155. Males are called Castelnéociens and females are called Castelnéociennes.

== Location and geography ==
Châtenoy is just off Départemental road 403, about 1.75 miles northeast of Aufferville and 4.2 miles southwest of Nemours. Its nearest neighbors are the villages of Aufferville to the southwest, Chevraivilliers to the northwest, Ormesson to the northeast, and Faÿ-lès-Nemours to the southwest.

It is located on the south part of the sedimentary Paris Basin and is rated as seismic zone one, indicating very little earthquake activity. It has no surface water bodies or water systems. In 1999, it became part of the French Gâtinais Regional Nature Reserve when that was created to curb urban growth into rural areas and celebrate and promote the particular geography and agriculture of the area.

== History ==
The village was first mentioned by name when it was referred to as "Castanetum" in a Latin text in 1120. That name derived from the Latin word castanea, which meant chestnut grove, or "Châtaigneraie." The name was given as Castenayum in 1350, Chatenoy lez Sainct Mathurin in 1414, Chastenay in 1489, and L'église Saint Loup de Chastenoy in 1570.

According to historian G. Leroy, the Edict of Beaulieu was signed in Châtenoy a few years after the St. Bartholomew's Day massacre.

== See also ==
- Communes of the S 1414 and Seine-et-Marne department
