= Ormesson =

Ormesson is the name or part of the name of two communes of France:

- Ormesson in the Seine-et-Marne département
- Ormesson-sur-Marne in the Val-de-Marne département

== See also ==
- Henri Lefèvre d'Ormesson (1751–1808), French politician
- Jean d'Ormesson (1925-2017), French writer
- Wladimir d'Ormesson (1888-1973), French writer and diplomat, uncle of Jean
