= Villebéon =

- Commune
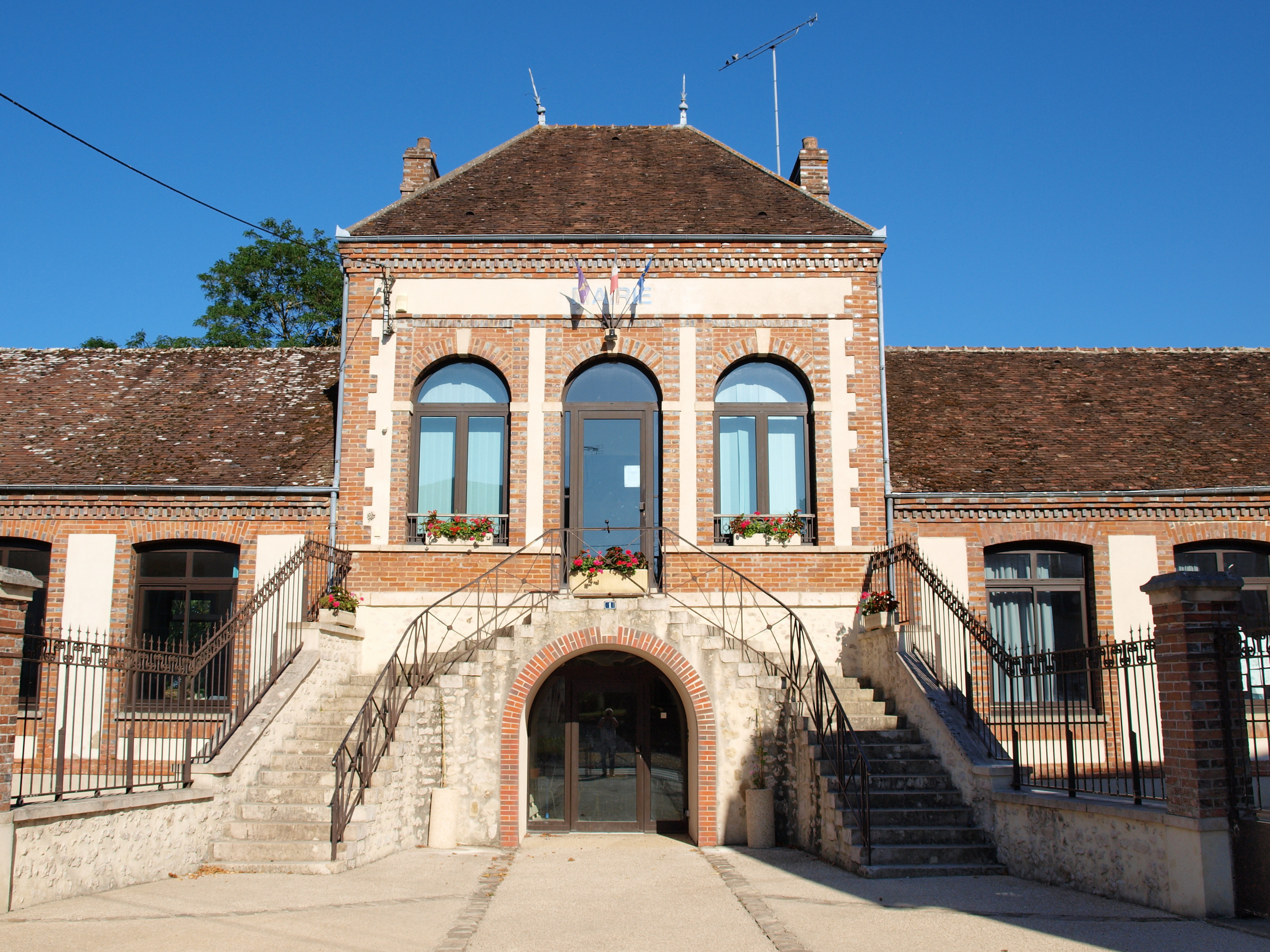
- The town hall in Villebéon

- Coat of arms
- Location of Villebéon
- Location within France Location within Île-de-France (region)
- Coordinates: 48°12′33″N 2°56′27″E
- Country: France
- Region: Île-de-France
- Department: Seine-et-Marne
- Arrondissement: Fontainebleau
- Canton: Nemours
- Intercommunality: CC Gâtinais-Val de Loing

Government
  - Mayor (2020–2026): Francis Ple
- Area^{1}: 16.45 km^{2} (6.35 sq mi)
- Highest elevation: 152 m (499 ft)
- Lowest elevation: 103 m (338 ft)
- Population (2023): 452
  - Density: 27.5/km^{2} (71.2/sq mi)
- Time zone: UTC+01:00 (CET)
  - Summer (DST): UTC+02:00 (CEST)
- INSEE/Postal code: 77500 /77710
- ^{1} French Land Register data, which excludes lakes, ponds, glaciers > 1 km^{2} (0.386 sq mi or 247 acres) and river estuaries.

Villebéon (French pronunciation: [vilbeɔ̃]) is a commune in the Seine-et-Marne department in the Île-de-France region in north-central France.

== Demographics ==
Inhabitants of Villebéon are called Villebéonais.

== See also ==
- Communes of the Seine-et-Marne department
