= Lorrez-le-Bocage-Préaux =

- Commune
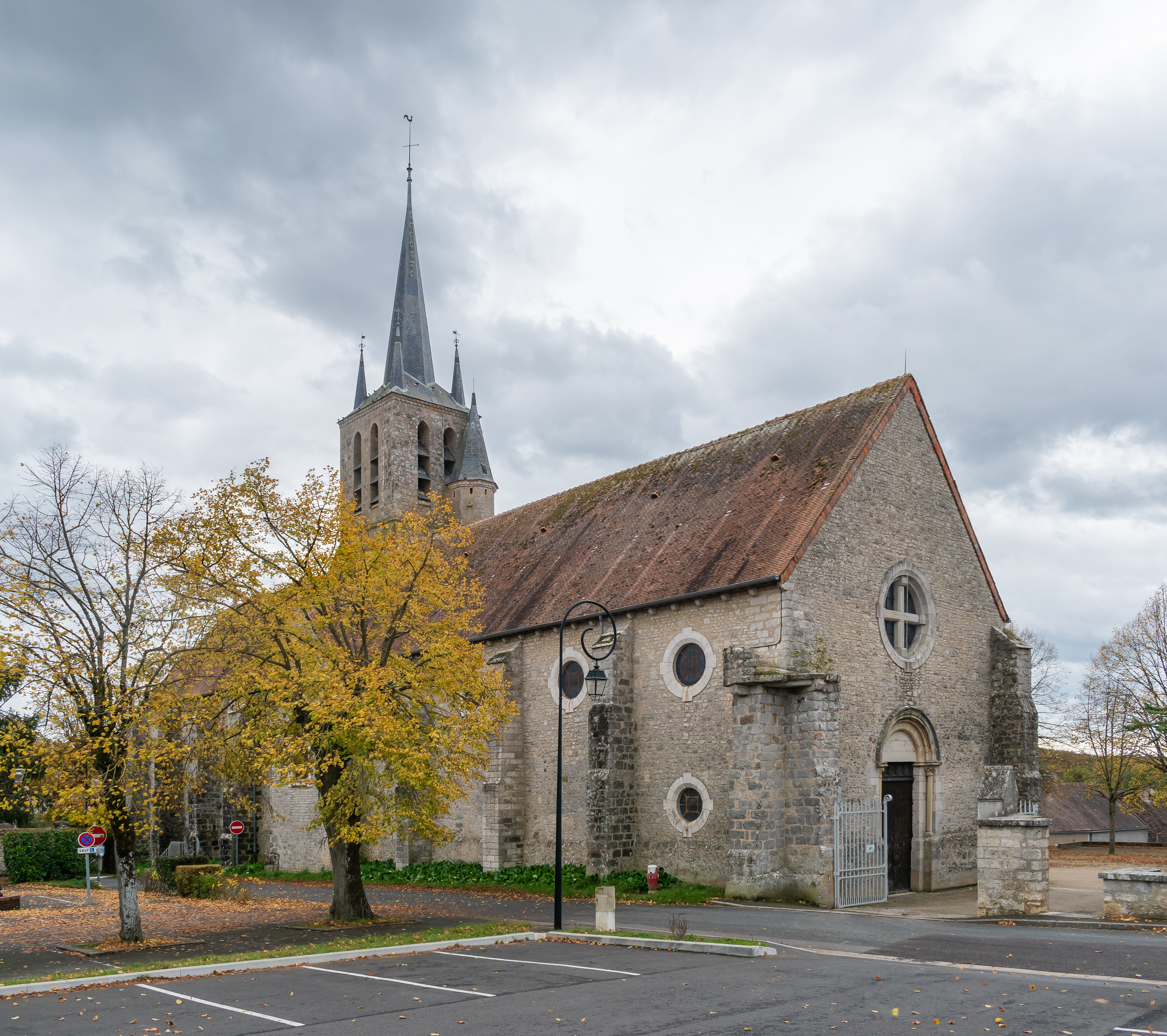
- The church in Lorrez-le-Bocage

- Coat of arms
- Location of Lorrez-le-Bocage-Préaux
- Location within France Location within Île-de-France (region)
- Coordinates: 48°14′15″N 2°54′06″E
- Country: France
- Region: Île-de-France
- Department: Seine-et-Marne
- Arrondissement: Fontainebleau
- Canton: Nemours
- Intercommunality: CC Gâtinais-Val de Loing

Government
  - Mayor (2020–2026): Yves Boyer
- Area^{1}: 19.90 km^{2} (7.68 sq mi)
- Highest elevation: 148 m (486 ft)
- Lowest elevation: 89 m (292 ft)
- Population (2023): 1,274
  - Density: 64.02/km^{2} (165.8/sq mi)
- Time zone: UTC+01:00 (CET)
  - Summer (DST): UTC+02:00 (CEST)
- INSEE/Postal code: 77261 /77710
- ^{1} French Land Register data, which excludes lakes, ponds, glaciers > 1 km^{2} (0.386 sq mi or 247 acres) and river estuaries.

Lorrez-le-Bocage-Préaux (French pronunciation: [lɔʁe lə bɔkaʒ pʁeo]) is a commune in the Seine-et-Marne department in the Île-de-France region in north-central France. It was created in 1973 by the merger of two former communes: Lorrez-le-Bocage and Préaux.

== Geography ==
The commune is traversed by the Lunain river.

== Demographics ==
Inhabitants are called Lorréziens.

== See also ==
- Communes of the Seine-et-Marne department
