= Égreville =

- Commune
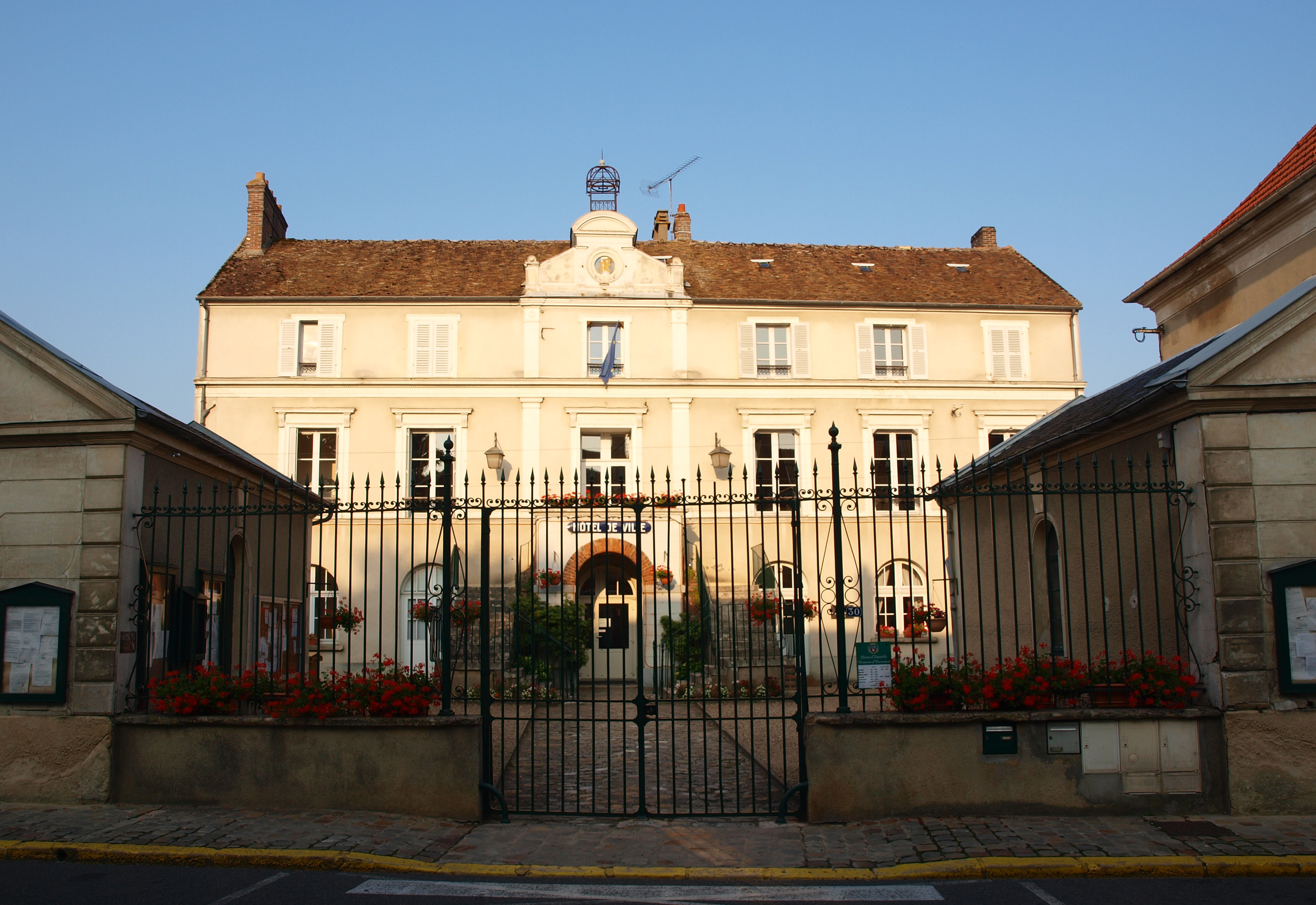
- The town hall in Égreville

- Coat of arms
- Location of Égreville
- Location within France Location within Île-de-France (region)
- Coordinates: 48°10′41″N 2°52′19″E
- Country: France
- Region: Île-de-France
- Department: Seine-et-Marne
- Arrondissement: Fontainebleau
- Canton: Nemours
- Intercommunality: CC Gâtinais-Val de Loing

Government
  - Mayor (2020–2026): Pascal Pommier
- Area^{1}: 31.84 km^{2} (12.29 sq mi)
- Highest elevation: 141 m (463 ft)
- Lowest elevation: 107 m (351 ft)
- Population (2023): 2,186
  - Density: 68.66/km^{2} (177.8/sq mi)
- Time zone: UTC+01:00 (CET)
  - Summer (DST): UTC+02:00 (CEST)
- INSEE/Postal code: 77168 /77620
- ^{1} French Land Register data, which excludes lakes, ponds, glaciers > 1 km^{2} (0.386 sq mi or 247 acres) and river estuaries.

Égreville (French pronunciation: [eɡʁəvil]) is a commune in the Seine-et-Marne department in the Île-de-France region in north-central France.

== Population ==
Historical population
Year	Pop.	±% p.a.
1968	1,212	—
1975	1,224	+0.14%
1982	1,342	+1.32%
1990	1,623	+2.40%
1999	1,841	+1.41%
2007	2,109	+1.71%
2012	2,167	+0.54%
2017	2,150	−0.16%
2023	2,186	+0.28%
Source: INSEE

Inhabitants of Égreville are called Égrevillois in French.

== See also ==
- Communes of the Seine-et-Marne department
