= Remauville =

- Commune
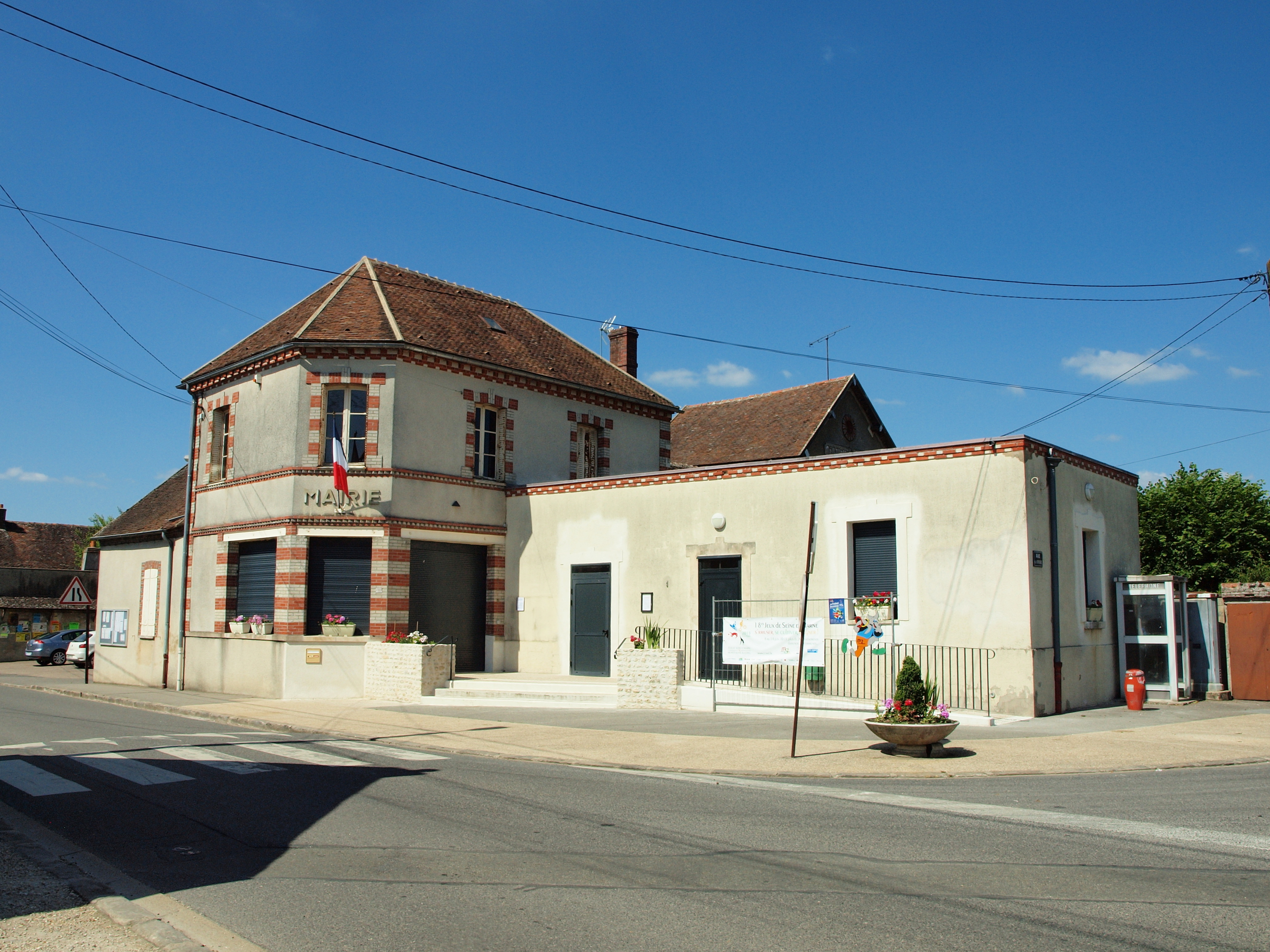
- The town hall in Remauville
- Location of Remauville
- Location within France Location within Île-de-France (region)
- Coordinates: 48°12′52″N 2°49′27″E
- Country: France
- Region: Île-de-France
- Department: Seine-et-Marne
- Arrondissement: Fontainebleau
- Canton: Nemours
- Intercommunality: CC Moret Seine et Loing

Government
  - Mayor (2020–2026): Catherine Pénifaure
- Area^{1}: 10.88 km^{2} (4.20 sq mi)
- Highest elevation: 136 m (446 ft)
- Lowest elevation: 114 m (374 ft)
- Population (2023): 449
  - Density: 41.3/km^{2} (107/sq mi)
- Time zone: UTC+01:00 (CET)
  - Summer (DST): UTC+02:00 (CEST)
- INSEE/Postal code: 77387 /77710
- ^{1} French Land Register data, which excludes lakes, ponds, glaciers > 1 km^{2} (0.386 sq mi or 247 acres) and river estuaries.

Remauville (French pronunciation: [ʁəmovil]) is a commune in the Seine-et-Marne department in the Île-de-France region in north-central France.

== Demographics ==
The inhabitants are called Remauvillois.

== See also ==
- Communes of the Seine-et-Marne department
