= Moncourt-Fromonville =

- Commune
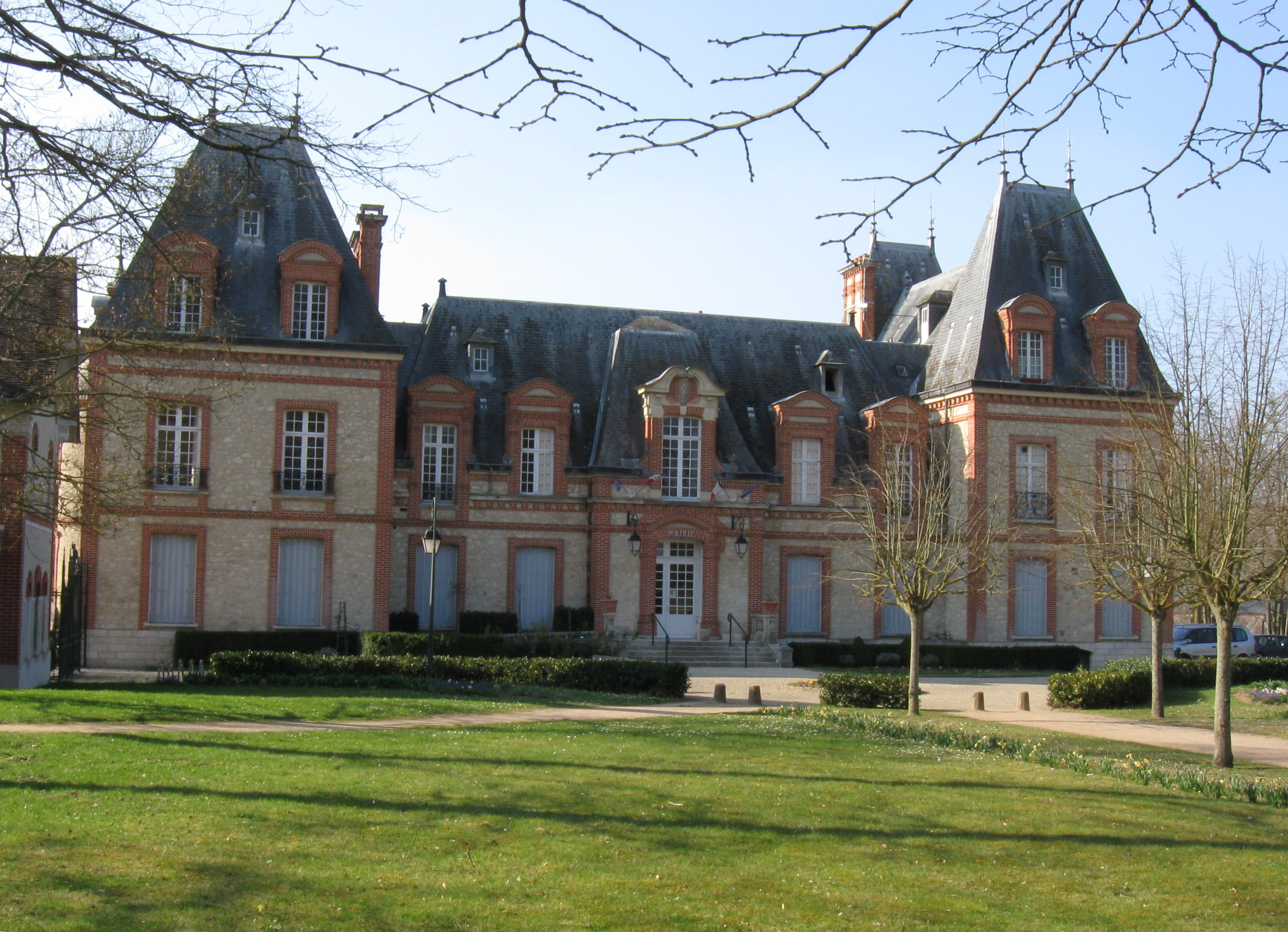
- The chateau in Moncourt

- Coat of arms
- Location of Moncourt-Fromonville
- Location within France Location within Île-de-France (region)
- Coordinates: 48°18′21″N 2°42′18″E
- Country: France
- Region: Île-de-France
- Department: Seine-et-Marne
- Arrondissement: Fontainebleau
- Canton: Nemours

Government
  - Mayor (2021–2026): Maxime Labelle
- Area^{1}: 8.17 km^{2} (3.15 sq mi)
- Highest elevation: 85 m (279 ft)
- Lowest elevation: 55 m (180 ft)
- Population (2023): 1,891
  - Density: 231/km^{2} (599/sq mi)
- Time zone: UTC+01:00 (CET)
  - Summer (DST): UTC+02:00 (CEST)
- INSEE/Postal code: 77302 /77140
- ^{1} French Land Register data, which excludes lakes, ponds, glaciers > 1 km^{2} (0.386 sq mi or 247 acres) and river estuaries.

Moncourt-Fromonville (French pronunciation: [mɔ̃kuʁ fʁɔmɔ̃vil], before 2025: Montcourt-Fromonville) is a commune in the Seine-et-Marne department in the Île-de-France region in north-central France.

== Demographics ==
Inhabitants are called Montcourtois.

== See also ==
- Communes of the Seine-et-Marne department
