= Garentreville =

- Commune
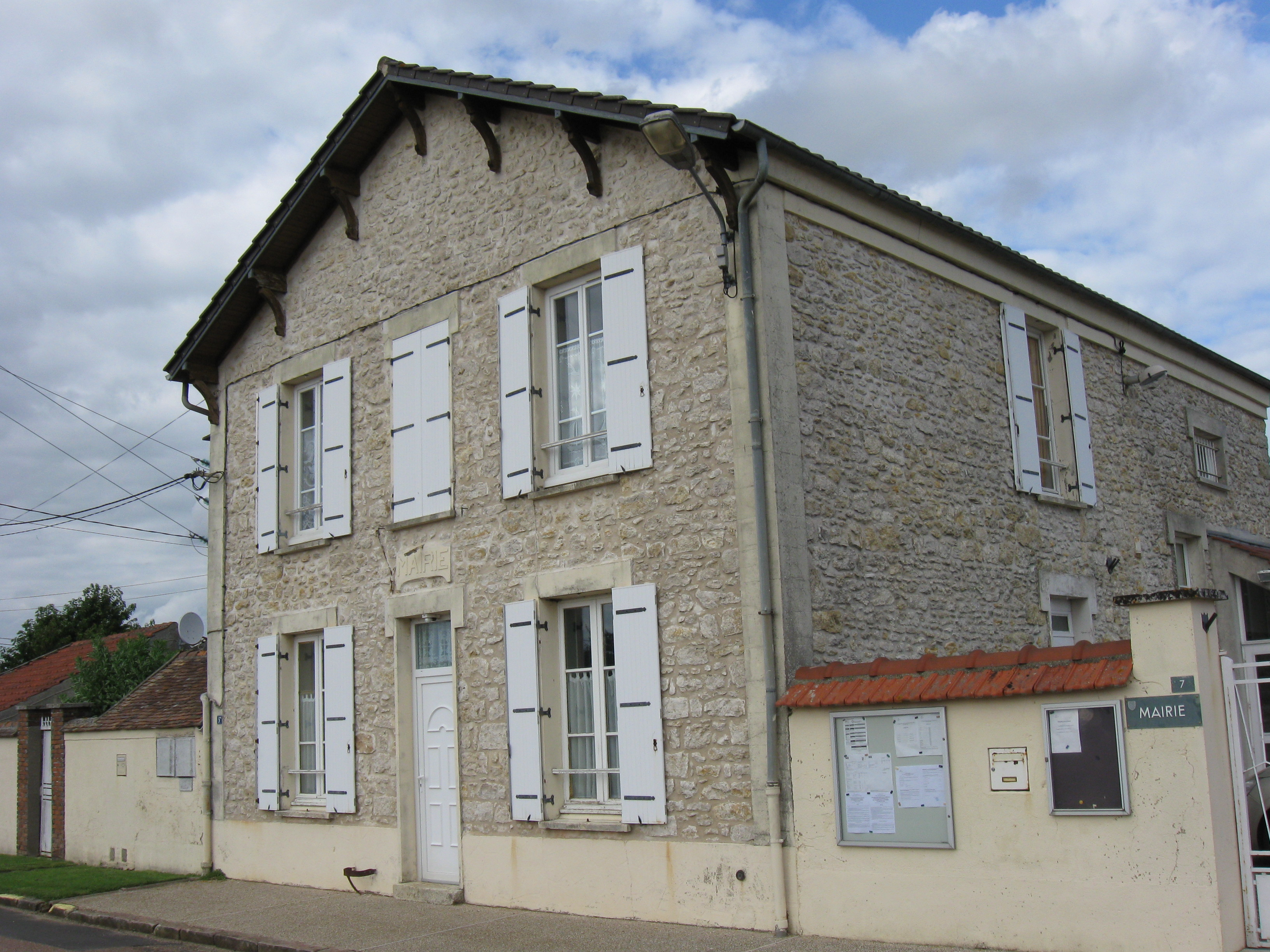
- The town hall in Garentreville
- Location of Garentreville
- Location within France Location within Île-de-France (region)
- Coordinates: 48°14′12″N 2°32′59″E
- Country: France
- Region: Île-de-France
- Department: Seine-et-Marne
- Arrondissement: Fontainebleau
- Canton: Nemours

Government
  - Mayor (2020–2026): Jean-Luc Racinet
- Area^{1}: 6.35 km^{2} (2.45 sq mi)
- Highest elevation: 144 m (472 ft)
- Lowest elevation: 107 m (351 ft)
- Population (2023): 123
  - Density: 19.4/km^{2} (50.2/sq mi)
- Time zone: UTC+01:00 (CET)
  - Summer (DST): UTC+02:00 (CEST)
- INSEE/Postal code: 77200 /77890
- ^{1} French Land Register data, which excludes lakes, ponds, glaciers > 1 km^{2} (0.386 sq mi or 247 acres) and river estuaries.

Garentreville (French pronunciation: [ɡaʁɑ̃tʁəvil]) is a commune in the Seine-et-Marne department in the Île-de-France region in north-central France.

== Demographics ==
The inhabitants are called Garentrevillois.

== See also ==
- Communes of the Seine-et-Marne department
