= Château-Landon =

- Commune
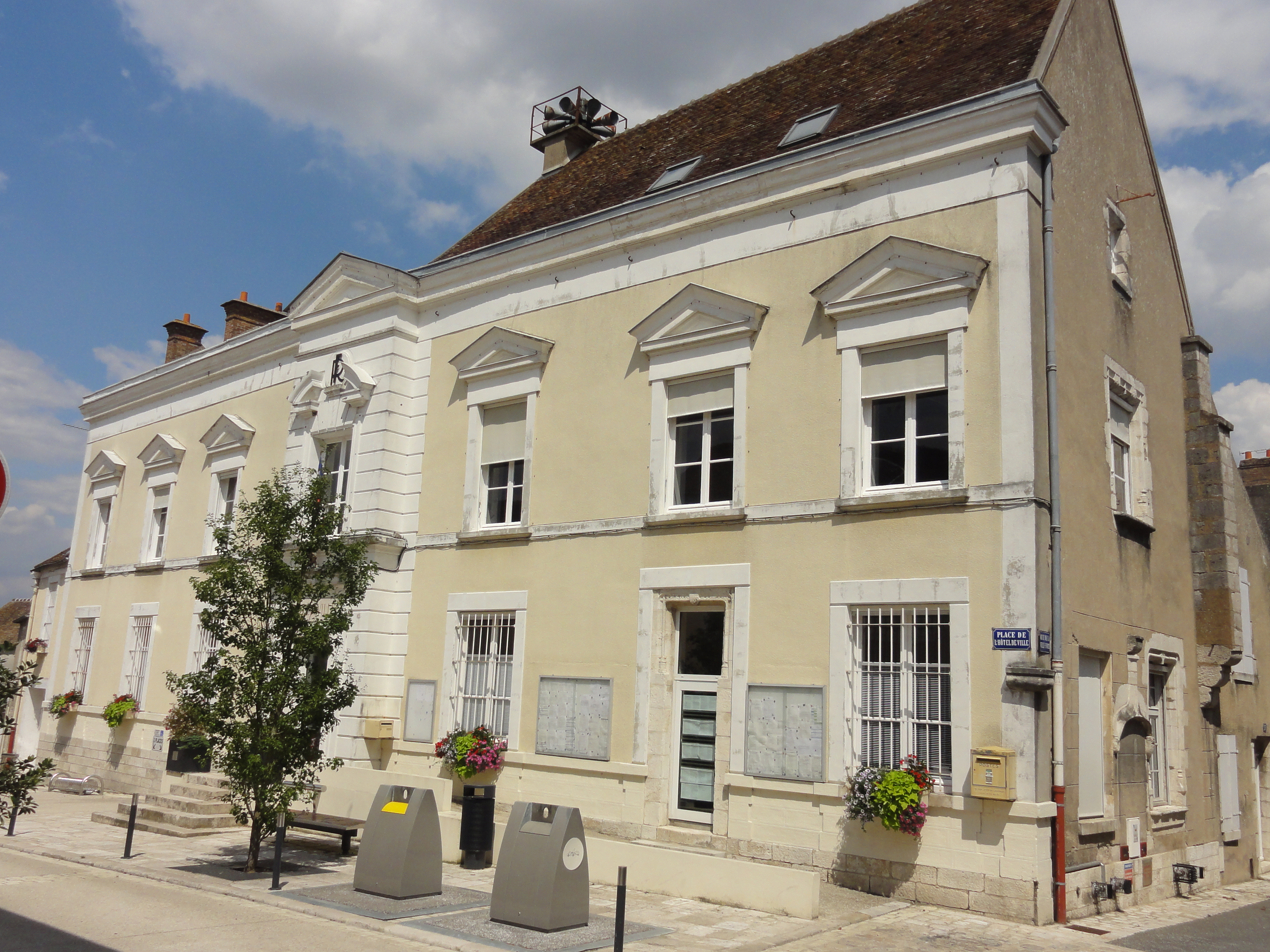
- The town hall in Château-Landon

- Coat of arms
- Location of Château-Landon
- Location within France Location within Île-de-France (region)
- Coordinates: 48°09′00″N 2°42′04″E
- Country: France
- Region: Île-de-France
- Department: Seine-et-Marne
- Arrondissement: Fontainebleau
- Canton: Nemours
- Intercommunality: CC Gâtinais-Val de Loing

Government
  - Mayor (2020–2026): Valérie Lagille
- Area^{1}: 29.35 km^{2} (11.33 sq mi)
- Highest elevation: 116 m (381 ft)
- Lowest elevation: 66 m (217 ft)
- Population (2023): 3,149
  - Density: 107.3/km^{2} (277.9/sq mi)
- Time zone: UTC+01:00 (CET)
  - Summer (DST): UTC+02:00 (CEST)
- INSEE/Postal code: 77099 /77570
- ^{1} French Land Register data, which excludes lakes, ponds, glaciers > 1 km^{2} (0.386 sq mi or 247 acres) and river estuaries.

Château-Landon (French pronunciation: [ʃɑto lɑ̃dɔ̃]) is a commune in the Seine-et-Marne department in the Île-de-France region in north-central France. The commune contains the Souppes-sur-Loing quarry, where the bright white travertine stones for the construction of the Sacré-Cœur, Paris, were sourced. Formerly the seat of the canton of Château-Landon, it has been part of the canton of Nemours since 2015.

== Population ==
Historical population
Year	Pop.	±% p.a.
1968	2,644	—
1975	3,020	+1.92%
1982	2,929	−0.44%
1990	3,314	+1.56%
1999	3,364	+0.17%
2007	3,072	−1.13%
2012	3,142	+0.45%
2017	2,952	−1.24%
2023	3,149	+1.08%
Source: INSEE

The inhabitants are called Chatellandonnais or Castellandonnais in French.

== See also ==
- Communes of the Seine-et-Marne department
