= Poligny, Seine-et-Marne =

Poligny
- Commune
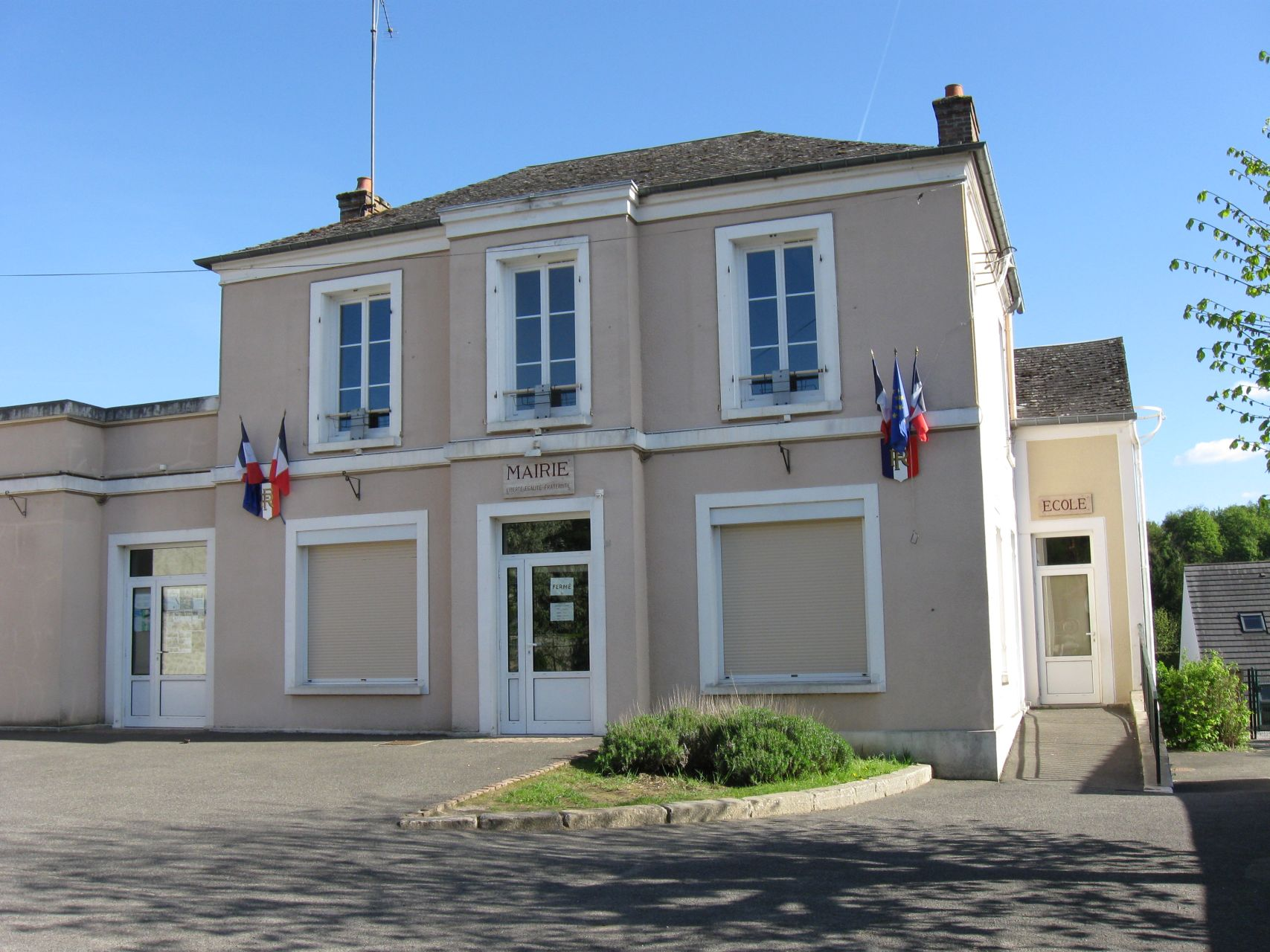
- The town hall in Poligny
- Location of Poligny
- Location within France Location within Île-de-France (region)
- Coordinates: 48°13′29″N 2°44′40″E
- Country: France
- Region: Île-de-France
- Department: Seine-et-Marne
- Arrondissement: Fontainebleau
- Canton: Nemours
- Intercommunality: CC Gâtinais-Val de Loing

Government
  - Mayor (2020–2026): Gérard Genevieve
- Area^{1}: 27.34 km^{2} (10.56 sq mi)
- Highest elevation: 138 m (453 ft)
- Lowest elevation: 63 m (207 ft)
- Population (2023): 825
  - Density: 30.2/km^{2} (78.2/sq mi)
- Time zone: UTC+01:00 (CET)
  - Summer (DST): UTC+02:00 (CEST)
- INSEE/Postal code: 77370 /77167
- ^{1} French Land Register data, which excludes lakes, ponds, glaciers > 1 km^{2} (0.386 sq mi or 247 acres) and river estuaries.

Poligny (French pronunciation: [pɔliɲi]) is a commune in the Seine and Marne department in the Île-de-France region in north-central France near Paris

== See also ==
- Communes of the Seine-et-Marne department
