= Vaux-sur-Lunain =

- Commune
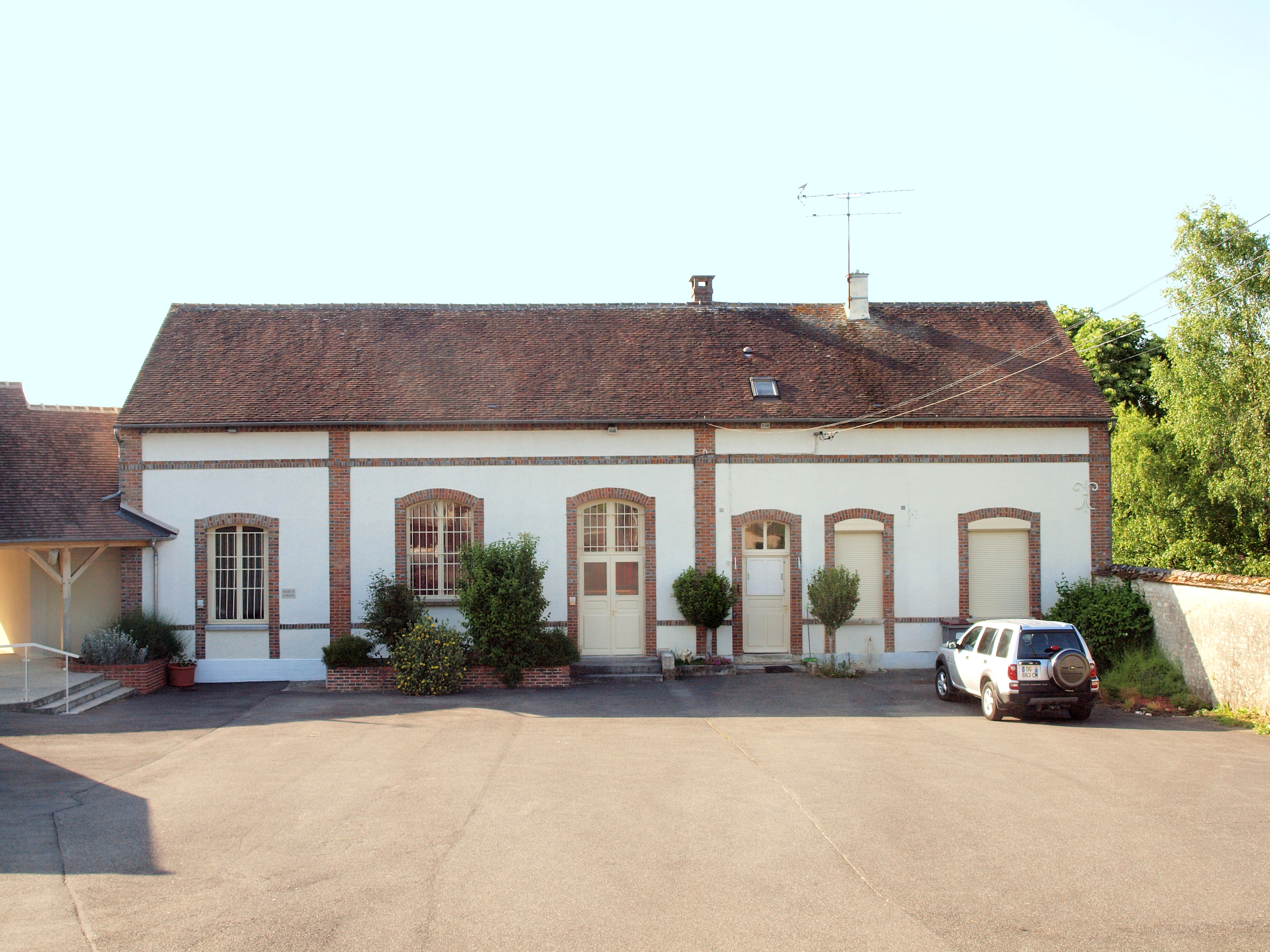
- The town hall in Vaux-sur-Lunain
- Location of Vaux-sur-Lunain
- Location within France Location within Île-de-France (region)
- Coordinates: 48°13′42″N 2°56′11″E
- Country: France
- Region: Île-de-France
- Department: Seine-et-Marne
- Arrondissement: Fontainebleau
- Canton: Nemours
- Intercommunality: CC Gâtinais-Val de Loing

Government
  - Mayor (2020–2026): Vincent Chianese
- Area^{1}: 8.47 km^{2} (3.27 sq mi)
- Highest elevation: 152 m (499 ft)
- Lowest elevation: 102 m (335 ft)
- Population (2023): 229
  - Density: 27.0/km^{2} (70.0/sq mi)
- Demonym(s): Vaulxois, Vaulxoise
- Time zone: UTC+01:00 (CET)
  - Summer (DST): UTC+02:00 (CEST)
- INSEE/Postal code: 77489 /77710
- ^{1} French Land Register data, which excludes lakes, ponds, glaciers > 1 km^{2} (0.386 sq mi or 247 acres) and river estuaries.

Vaux-sur-Lunain (French pronunciation: [vo syʁ lynɛ̃], literally Vaux on Lunain) is a commune in the Seine-et-Marne department, Île-de-France, north central France.

== Geography ==
The commune is traversed by the Lunain river.

== Demographics ==
Inhabitants of Vaux-sur-Lunain are called Vaulxois.

== See also ==
- Communes of the Seine-et-Marne department
