= Arrondissement of Fontainebleau =

Coordinates: 48°24′03″N 2°41′58″E

Fontainebleau
- Arrondissement
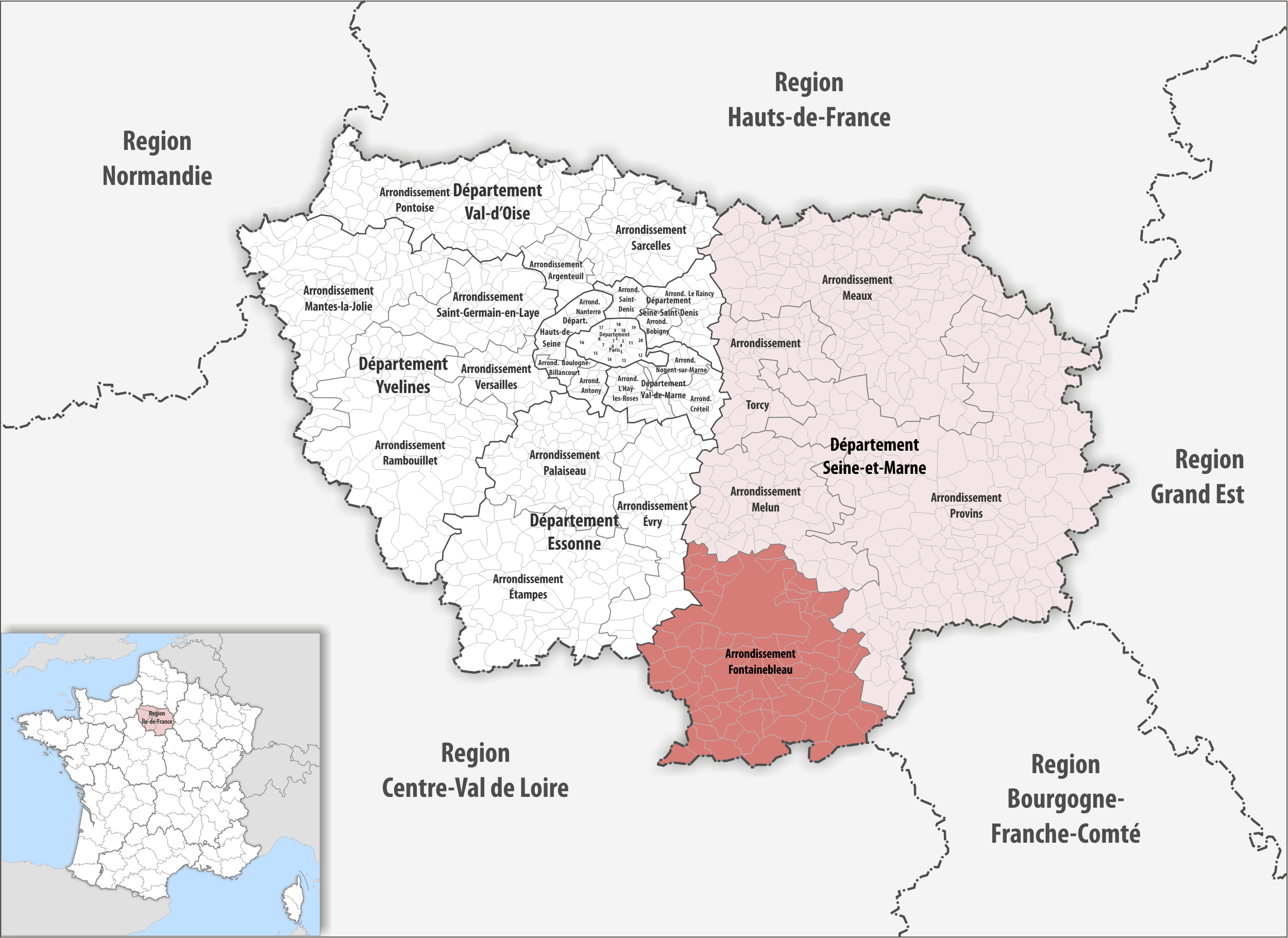
- Location within the region Île-de-France
- Country: France
- Region: Île-de-France
- Department: Seine-et-Marne
- No. of communes: {{{nbcomm}}}
- Area: 1,228.5 km^{2} (474.3 sq mi)
- Population (2023): 156,615
  - Density: 127.48/km^{2} (330.18/sq mi)
- INSEE code: 774

The arrondissement of Fontainebleau is an arrondissement of France in the Seine-et-Marne department in the Île-de-France region. It has 85 communes. Its population is 156,450 (2021), and its area is 1,228.5 km^{2} (474.3 sq mi).

== Composition ==
The communes of the arrondissement of Fontainebleau, and their INSEE codes, are:

1. Achères-la-Forêt (77001)
2. Amponville (77003)
3. Arbonne-la-Forêt (77006)
4. Arville (77009)
5. Aufferville (77011)
6. Avon (77014)
7. Bagneaux-sur-Loing (77016)
8. Barbizon (77022)
9. Beaumont-du-Gâtinais (77027)
10. Bois-le-Roi (77037)
11. Boissy-aux-Cailles (77041)
12. Bougligny (77045)
13. Boulancourt (77046)
14. Bourron-Marlotte (77048)
15. Bransles (77050)
16. Burcy (77056)
17. Buthiers (77060)
18. Cély (77065)
19. Chailly-en-Bière (77069)
20. Chaintreaux (77071)
21. Champagne-sur-Seine (77079)
22. La Chapelle-la-Reine (77088)
23. Chartrettes (77096)
24. Château-Landon (77099)
25. Châtenoy (77102)
26. Chenou (77110)
27. Chevrainvilliers (77112)
28. Darvault (77156)
29. Dormelles (77161)
30. Égreville (77168)
31. Faÿ-lès-Nemours (77178)
32. Flagy (77184)
33. Fleury-en-Bière (77185)
34. Fontainebleau (77186)
35. Fromont (77198)
36. Garentreville (77200)
37. La Genevraye (77202)
38. Gironville (77207)
39. Grez-sur-Loing (77216)
40. Guercheville (77220)
41. Héricy (77226)
42. Ichy (77230)
43. Larchant (77244)
44. Lorrez-le-Bocage-Préaux (77261)
45. La Madeleine-sur-Loing (77267)
46. Maisoncelles-en-Gâtinais (77271)
47. Moncourt-Fromonville (77302)
48. Mondreville (77297)
49. Montigny-sur-Loing (77312)
50. Moret-Loing-et-Orvanne (77316)
51. Nanteau-sur-Essonne (77328)
52. Nanteau-sur-Lunain (77329)
53. Nemours (77333)
54. Noisy-sur-École (77339)
55. Nonville (77340)
56. Obsonville (77342)
57. Ormesson (77348)
58. Paley (77353)
59. Perthes (77359)
60. Poligny (77370)
61. Recloses (77386)
62. Remauville (77387)
63. Rumont (77395)
64. Saint-Germain-sur-École (77412)
65. Saint-Mammès (77419)
66. Saint-Martin-en-Bière (77425)
67. Saint-Pierre-lès-Nemours (77431)
68. Saint-Sauveur-sur-École (77435)
69. Samois-sur-Seine (77441)
70. Samoreau (77442)
71. Souppes-sur-Loing (77458)
72. Thomery (77463)
73. Tousson (77471)
74. Treuzy-Levelay (77473)
75. Ury (77477)
76. Le Vaudoué (77485)
77. Vaux-sur-Lunain (77489)
78. Vernou-la-Celle-sur-Seine (77494)
79. Ville-Saint-Jacques (77516)
80. Villebéon (77500)
81. Villecerf (77501)
82. Villemaréchal (77504)
83. Villemer (77506)
84. Villiers-sous-Grez (77520)
85. Vulaines-sur-Seine (77533)

== History ==
The arrondissement of Fontainebleau was created in 1800, disbanded in 1926 and restored in 1988. At the January 2017 reorganisation of the arrondissements of Seine-et-Marne, it received 10 communes from the arrondissement of Melun, and it lost seven communes to the arrondissement of Provins.

As a result of the reorganisation of the cantons of France which came into effect in 2015, the borders of the cantons are no longer related to the borders of the arrondissements. The cantons of the arrondissement of Fontainebleau were, as of January 2015:

1. La Chapelle-la-Reine
2. Château-Landon
3. Fontainebleau
4. Lorrez-le-Bocage-Préaux
5. Moret-sur-Loing
6. Nemours
