= Darvault =

- Commune
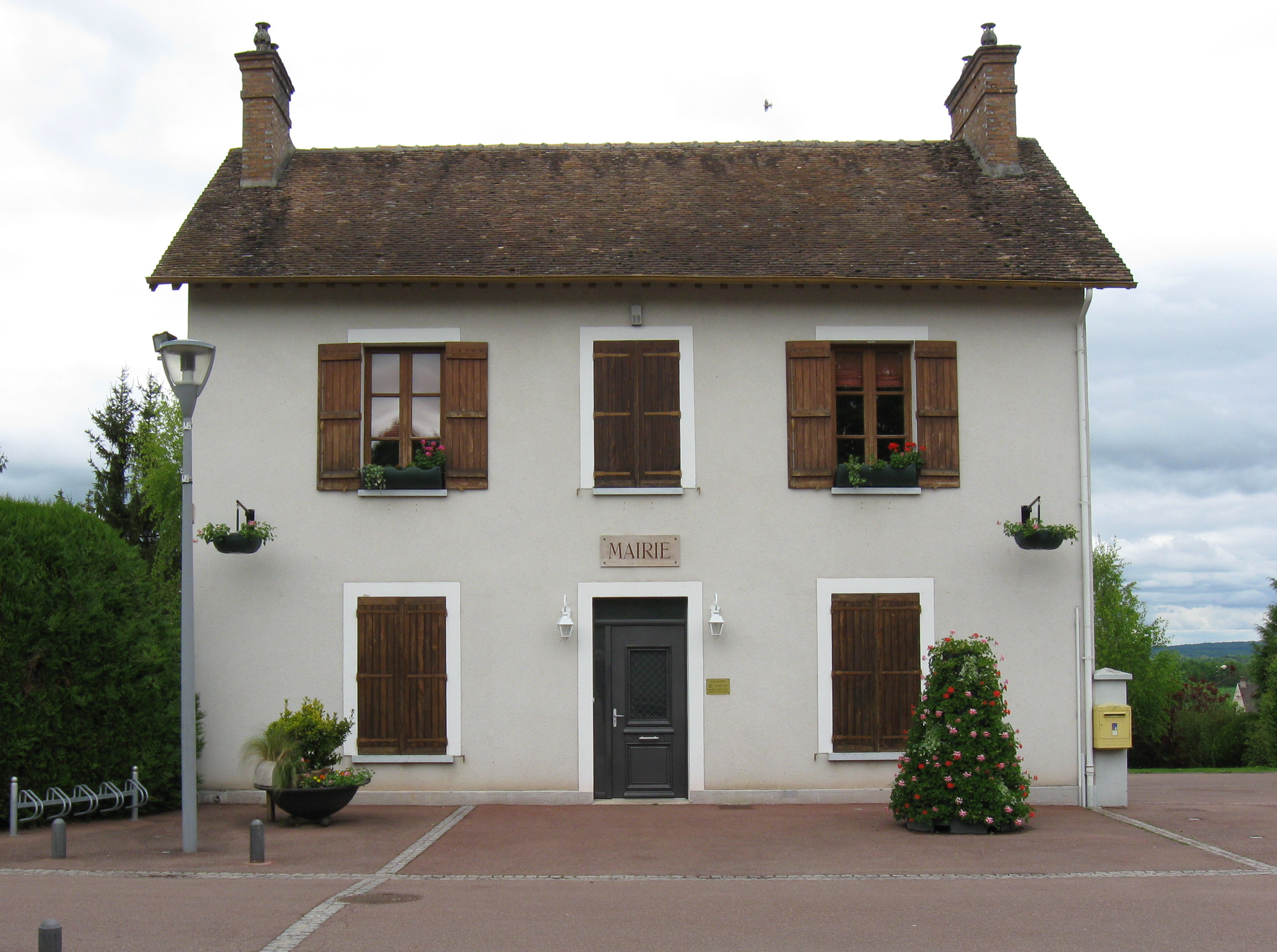
- The town hall in Darvault
- Location of Darvault
- Location within France Location within Île-de-France (region)
- Coordinates: 48°16′18″N 2°43′56″E
- Country: France
- Region: Île-de-France
- Department: Seine-et-Marne
- Arrondissement: Fontainebleau
- Canton: Nemours

Government
  - Mayor (2022–2026): Fabrice Jeulin
- Area^{1}: 7.83 km^{2} (3.02 sq mi)
- Highest elevation: 137 m (449 ft)
- Lowest elevation: 57 m (187 ft)
- Population (2023): 987
  - Density: 126/km^{2} (326/sq mi)
- Time zone: UTC+01:00 (CET)
  - Summer (DST): UTC+02:00 (CEST)
- INSEE/Postal code: 77156 /77140
- ^{1} French Land Register data, which excludes lakes, ponds, glaciers > 1 km^{2} (0.386 sq mi or 247 acres) and river estuaries.

Darvault (French pronunciation: [daʁvo]) is a commune in the Seine-et-Marne department in the Île-de-France region in north-central France.

== Demographics ==
Inhabitants of Darvault are called Darvaultois.

== See also ==
- Communes of the Seine-et-Marne department
