= Communauté de communes Gâtinais-Val de Loing =

Federation of municipalities in France

Gâtinais-Val de Loing
- Communauté de communes
- Interactive map of Gâtinais-Val de Loing
- Coordinates: 48°11′N 02°44′E
- Country: France
- Region: Île-de-France
- Department: Seine-et-Marne
- No. of communes: {{{nbcomm}}}
- Established: 2010
- Area: 338.0 km^{2} (130.5 sq mi)
- Population (2019): 18,662
  - Density: 55.21/km^{2} (143.0/sq mi)

The Communauté de communes Gâtinais-Val de Loing is a communauté de communes in the Seine-et-Marne département and in the Île-de-France région of France. It was formed on 1 January 2010, and also contains the communes of the former Communauté de communes de la Campagne Gâtinaise. Its seat is in Château-Landon. Its area is 338.0 km^{2}, and its population was 18,662 in 2019.

== Composition ==
The communauté de communes consists of the following 20 communes:

1. Arville
2. Aufferville
3. Beaumont-du-Gâtinais
4. Bougligny
5. Bransles
6. Chaintreaux
7. Château-Landon
8. Chenou
9. Égreville
10. Gironville
11. Ichy
12. Lorrez-le-Bocage-Préaux
13. La Madeleine-sur-Loing
14. Maisoncelles-en-Gâtinais
15. Mondreville
16. Obsonville
17. Poligny
18. Souppes-sur-Loing
19. Vaux-sur-Lunain
20. Villebéon
