= Chaintreaux =

- Commune
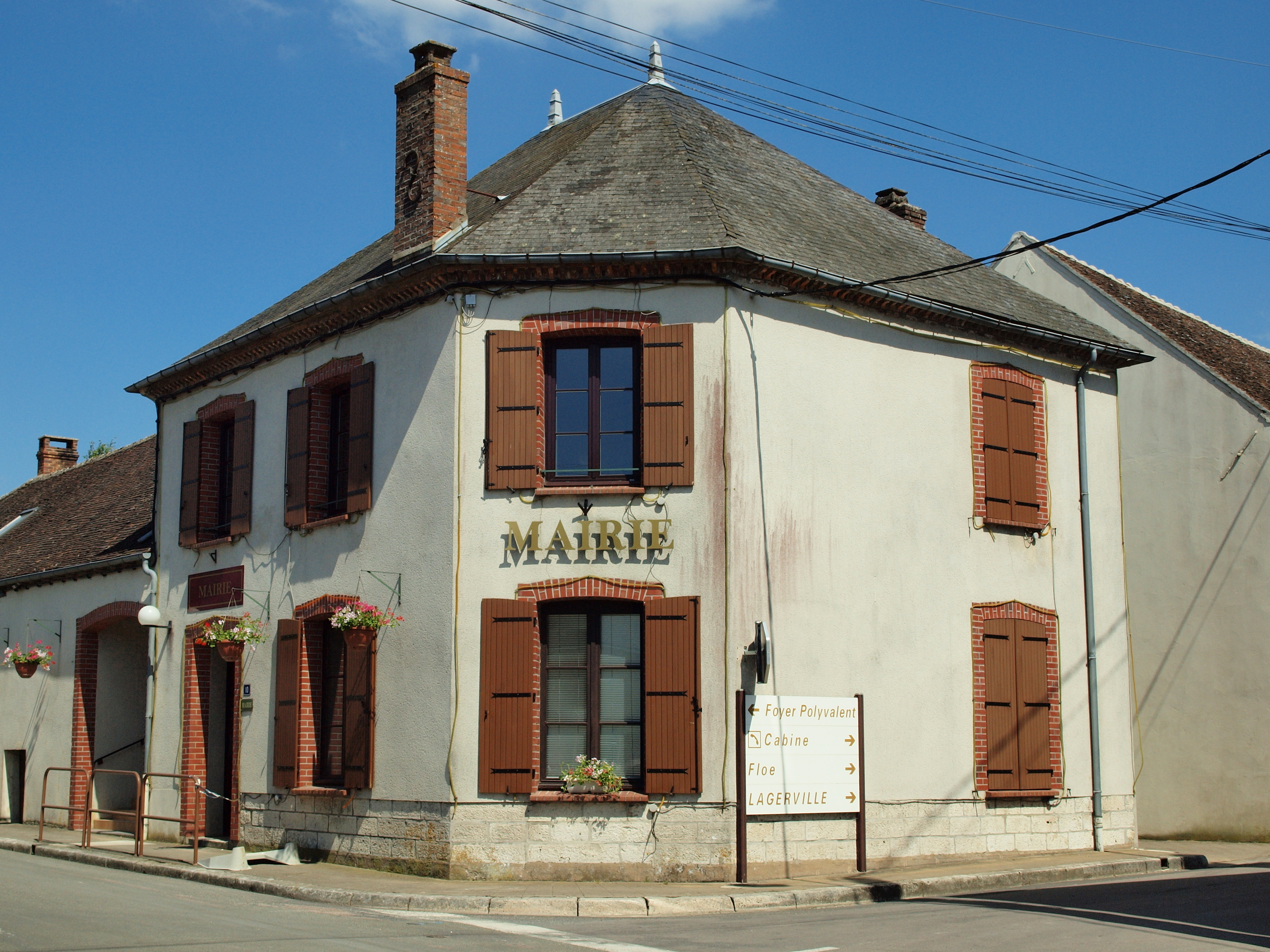
- The town hall in Chaintreaux

- Coat of arms
- Location of Chaintreaux
- Location within France Location within Île-de-France (region)
- Coordinates: 48°12′01″N 2°49′14″E
- Country: France
- Region: Île-de-France
- Department: Seine-et-Marne
- Arrondissement: Fontainebleau
- Canton: Nemours
- Intercommunality: CC Gâtinais-Val de Loing

Government
  - Mayor (2020–2026): Alexis Kerlo
- Area^{1}: 23.92 km^{2} (9.24 sq mi)
- Highest elevation: 133 m (436 ft)
- Lowest elevation: 88 m (289 ft)
- Population (2023): 821
  - Density: 34.3/km^{2} (88.9/sq mi)
- Time zone: UTC+01:00 (CET)
  - Summer (DST): UTC+02:00 (CEST)
- INSEE/Postal code: 77071 /77460
- ^{1} French Land Register data, which excludes lakes, ponds, glaciers > 1 km^{2} (0.386 sq mi or 247 acres) and river estuaries.

Chaintreaux (French pronunciation: [ʃɛ̃tʁo]) is a commune in the Seine-et-Marne department in the Île-de-France region in north-central France about one hour south of Paris. It is part of the Canton of Château-Landon and borders the Department of Loiret in the southern part. Agriculture is the main activity in this rural commune with about twenty mixed purpose farms. The cereals produced are wheat, barley and rapeseed.

== Demographics ==
Inhabitants are called Chanterelliens. The population of Chaintreaux was 785 in 1999, 854 in 2006 and 856 in 2007. The population density of Chaintreaux is 35.79 inhabitants per km². The number of housing of Chaintreaux was 393 in 2007. These homes of Chaintreaux consist of 310 main residences, 54 second or occasional homes and 29 vacant homes.

== History ==
The Commune of Chaintreaux draws its etymology of "chaintre" which means limit; this commune being in limit of the lordship of Dordives, Mez the Marshal, Loiret, Boulay, Néronville and Villebéon. Inside St. Peter's Church, Saint Paul dates from the 13th century, there are many tombstones including that of the Chain Chairs Chevallier Jehan. In the right chapel, the frescoes represent the annunciation and the burial. In the Saint Hubert Chapel, a painting depicting a vision of Saint Hubert and a carved wooden altarpiece dating from 1616 represents a hunting scene.

== See also ==
- Communes of the Seine-et-Marne department
