= Faÿ-lès-Nemours =

- Commune
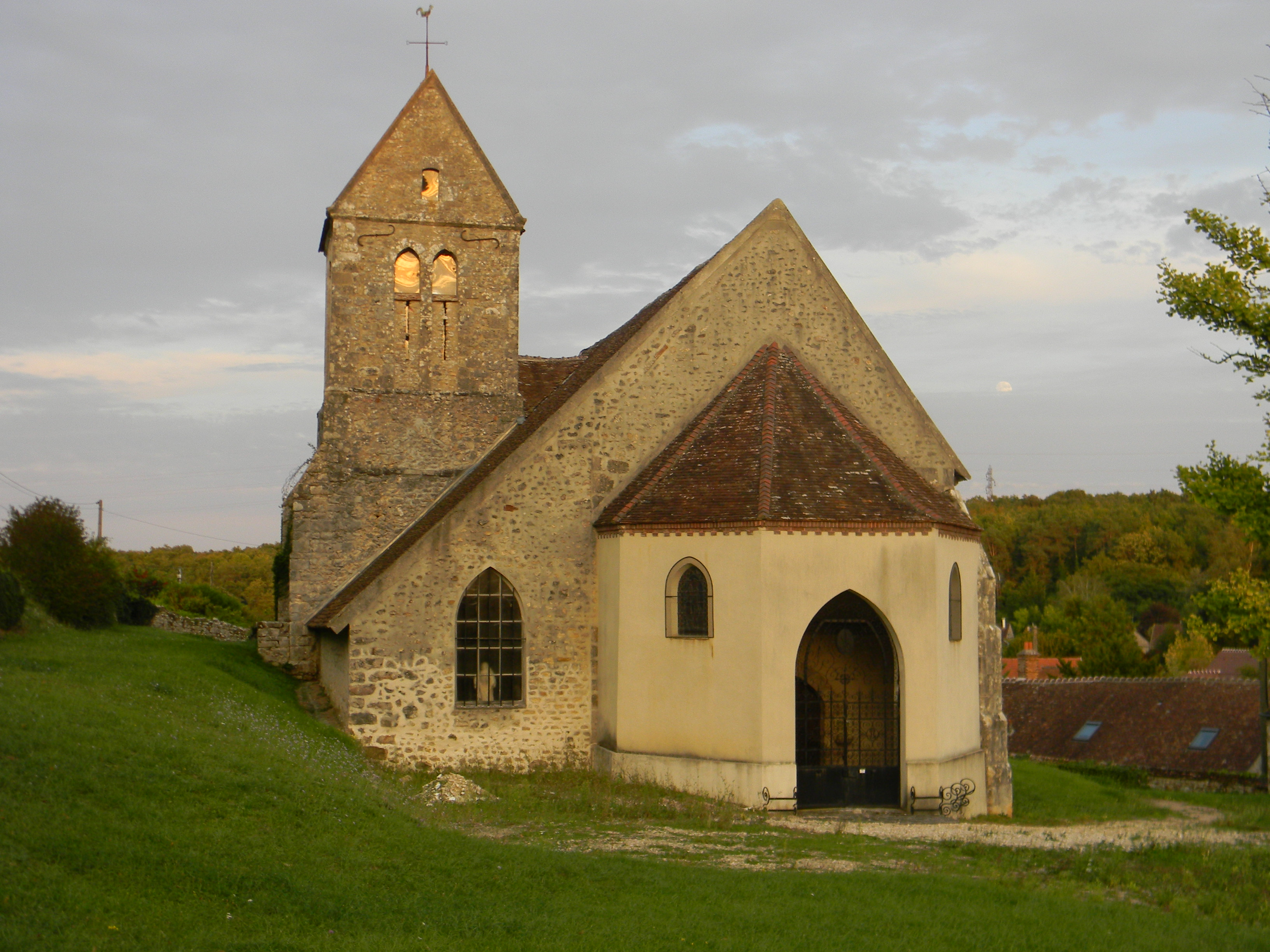
- The church in Faÿ-lès-Nemours

- Coat of arms
- Location of Faÿ-lès-Nemours
- Location within France Location within Île-de-France (region)
- Coordinates: 48°13′55″N 2°40′28″E
- Country: France
- Region: Île-de-France
- Department: Seine-et-Marne
- Arrondissement: Fontainebleau
- Canton: Nemours

Government
  - Mayor (2020–2026): Christian Peutot
- Area^{1}: 7.78 km^{2} (3.00 sq mi)
- Highest elevation: 122 m (400 ft)
- Lowest elevation: 63 m (207 ft)
- Population (2023): 524
  - Density: 67.4/km^{2} (174/sq mi)
- Time zone: UTC+01:00 (CET)
  - Summer (DST): UTC+02:00 (CEST)
- INSEE/Postal code: 77178 /77167
- ^{1} French Land Register data, which excludes lakes, ponds, glaciers > 1 km^{2} (0.386 sq mi or 247 acres) and river estuaries.

Faÿ-lès-Nemours (French pronunciation: [faj lɛ nəmuʁ], literally Faÿ near Nemours) is a commune in the Seine-et-Marne department in the Île-de-France region in north-central France.

== See also ==
- Communes of the Seine-et-Marne department
