= Canton of Nemours =

Coordinates: 48°16′02″N 2°42′10″E

Nemours
- Canton
- Country: France
- Region: Île-de-France
- Department: Seine-et-Marne
- No. of communes: {{{nbcomm}}}
- Area: 694.95 km^{2} (268.32 sq mi)
- Population (2023): 58,381
  - Density: 84.007/km^{2} (217.58/sq mi)
- INSEE code: 77 15

The canton of Nemours is a French administrative division, located in the arrondissement of Fontainebleau, in the Seine-et-Marne département (Île-de-France région).

== Demographics ==
Historical population
Year	Pop.	±% p.a.
2013	59,509	—
2018	59,050	−0.15%
Source: INSEE

== Composition ==
At the French canton reorganisation which came into effect in March 2015, the canton was expanded from 17 to 50 communes:

- Arville
- Aufferville
- Bagneaux-sur-Loing
- Beaumont-du-Gâtinais
- Blennes
- Bougligny
- Bransles
- Chaintreaux
- Château-Landon
- Châtenoy
- Chenou
- Chevrainvilliers
- Chevry-en-Sereine
- Darvault
- Diant
- Dormelles
- Égreville
- Faÿ-lès-Nemours
- Flagy
- Garentreville
- La Genevraye
- Gironville
- Grez-sur-Loing
- Ichy
- Larchant
- Lorrez-le-Bocage-Préaux
- La Madeleine-sur-Loing
- Maisoncelles-en-Gâtinais
- Moncourt-Fromonville
- Mondreville
- Montigny-sur-Loing
- Montmachoux
- Nanteau-sur-Lunain
- Nemours
- Noisy-Rudignon
- Nonville
- Obsonville
- Ormesson
- Paley
- Poligny
- Remauville
- Saint-Pierre-lès-Nemours
- Souppes-sur-Loing
- Thoury-Férottes
- Treuzy-Levelay
- Vaux-sur-Lunain
- Villebéon
- Villemaréchal
- Villemer
- Voulx

== See also ==
- Cantons of the Seine-et-Marne department
- Communes of the Seine-et-Marne department
