= Bougligny =

- Commune
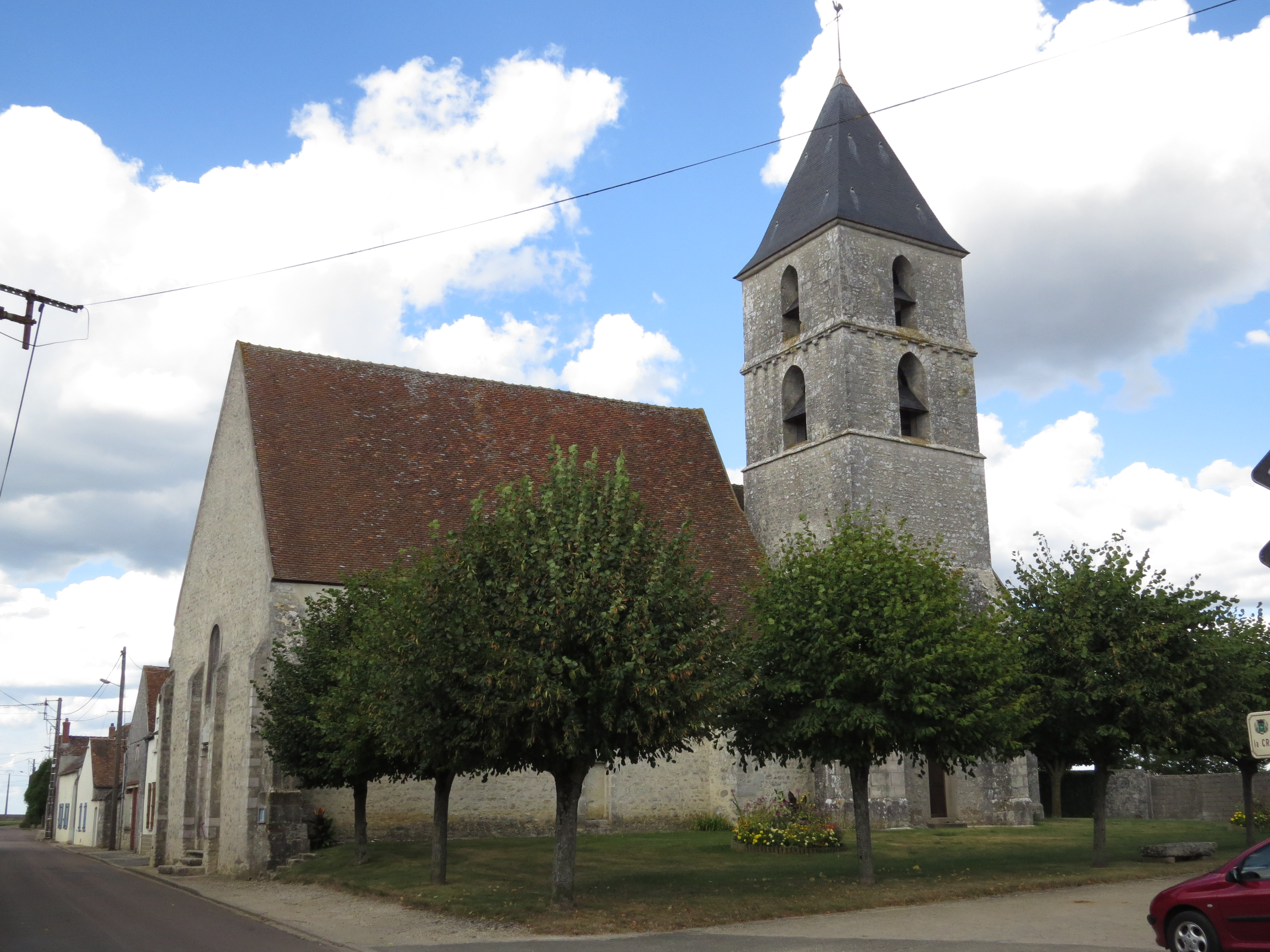
- The church in Bougligny

- Coat of arms
- Location of Bougligny
- Location within France Location within Île-de-France (region)
- Coordinates: 48°11′46″N 2°39′29″E
- Country: France
- Region: Île-de-France
- Department: Seine-et-Marne
- Arrondissement: Fontainebleau
- Canton: Nemours
- Intercommunality: CC Gâtinais-Val de Loing

Government
  - Mayor (2020–2026): Rose-Marie Lionnet
- Area^{1}: 16.31 km^{2} (6.30 sq mi)
- Highest elevation: 121 m (397 ft)
- Lowest elevation: 98 m (322 ft)
- Population (2023): 738
  - Density: 45.2/km^{2} (117/sq mi)
- Time zone: UTC+01:00 (CET)
  - Summer (DST): UTC+02:00 (CEST)
- INSEE/Postal code: 77045 /77570
- ^{1} French Land Register data, which excludes lakes, ponds, glaciers > 1 km^{2} (0.386 sq mi or 247 acres) and river estuaries.

Bougligny (French pronunciation: [buɡliɲi]) is a commune in the Seine-et-Marne department in the Île-de-France region in north-central France.

== Demographics ==
The inhabitants are called Bouglinois.

== See also ==
- Communes of the Seine-et-Marne department
