= Chevrainvilliers =

- Commune
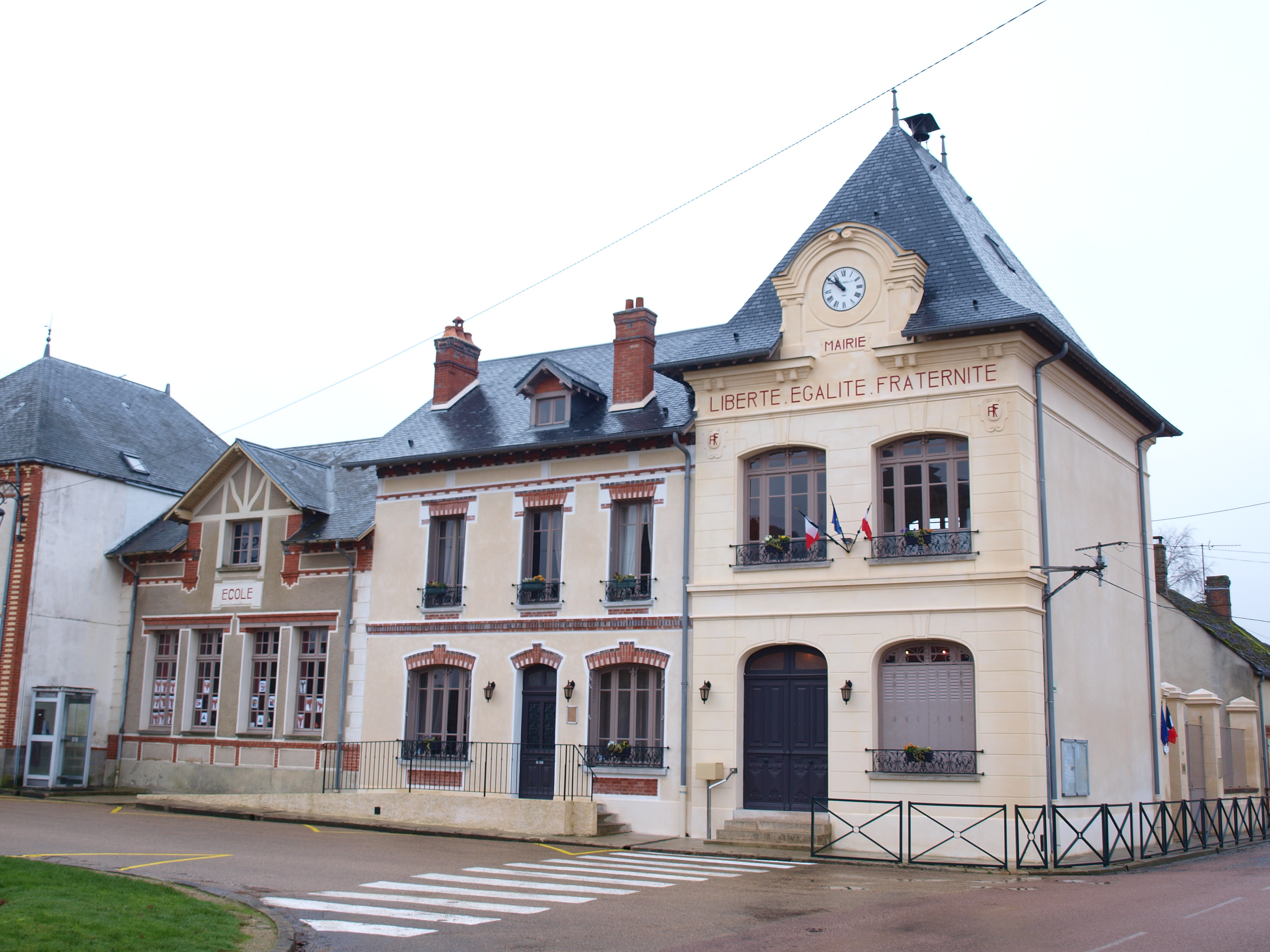
- The town hall in Chevrainvilliers
- Location of Chevrainvilliers
- Location within France Location within Île-de-France (region)
- Coordinates: 48°15′00″N 2°37′00″E
- Country: France
- Region: Île-de-France
- Department: Seine-et-Marne
- Arrondissement: Fontainebleau
- Canton: Nemours

Government
  - Mayor (2020–2026): Benoît Oudin
- Area^{1}: 8.95 km^{2} (3.46 sq mi)
- Highest elevation: 118 m (387 ft)
- Lowest elevation: 85 m (279 ft)
- Population (2023): 255
  - Density: 28.5/km^{2} (73.8/sq mi)
- Time zone: UTC+01:00 (CET)
  - Summer (DST): UTC+02:00 (CEST)
- INSEE/Postal code: 77112 /77760
- ^{1} French Land Register data, which excludes lakes, ponds, glaciers > 1 km^{2} (0.386 sq mi or 247 acres) and river estuaries.

Chevrainvilliers (French pronunciation: [ʃəvʁɛ̃vilje]) is a commune in the department in the Seine-et-Marne department in the Île-de-France region in north-central France.

== See also ==
- Communes of the Seine-et-Marne department
