= Maisoncelles-en-Gâtinais =

- Commune
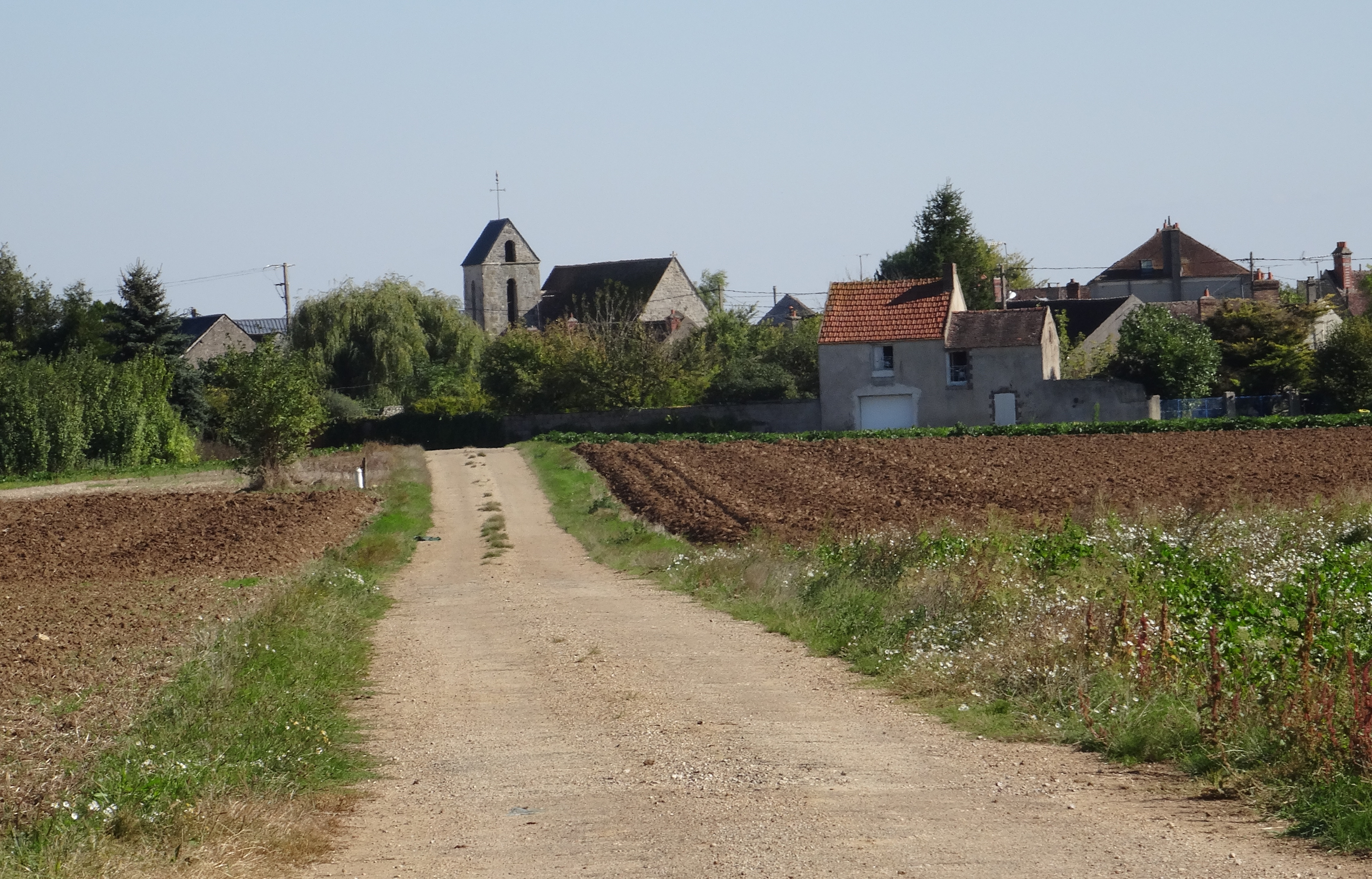
- A general view of Maisoncelles-en-Gâtinais
- Location of Maisoncelles-en-Gâtinais
- Location within France Location within Île-de-France (region)
- Coordinates: 48°11′18″N 2°37′37″E
- Country: France
- Region: Île-de-France
- Department: Seine-et-Marne
- Arrondissement: Fontainebleau
- Canton: Nemours
- Intercommunality: CC Gâtinais-Val de Loing

Government
  - Mayor (2020–2026): Maurice Garland
- Area^{1}: 8.58 km^{2} (3.31 sq mi)
- Highest elevation: 118 m (387 ft)
- Lowest elevation: 101 m (331 ft)
- Population (2023): 141
  - Density: 16.4/km^{2} (42.6/sq mi)
- Time zone: UTC+01:00 (CET)
  - Summer (DST): UTC+02:00 (CEST)
- INSEE/Postal code: 77271 /77570
- ^{1} French Land Register data, which excludes lakes, ponds, glaciers > 1 km^{2} (0.386 sq mi or 247 acres) and river estuaries.

Maisoncelles-en-Gâtinais (French: [mɛzɔ̃sɛl ɑ̃ ɡɑtinɛ]; literally "Small Houses in Gâtinais") is a commune in the Seine-et-Marne department in the Île-de-France region in north-central France.

== Demographics ==
Inhabitants are called Maisoncellois.

== See also ==
- Communes of the Seine-et-Marne department
