= Bransles =

- Commune
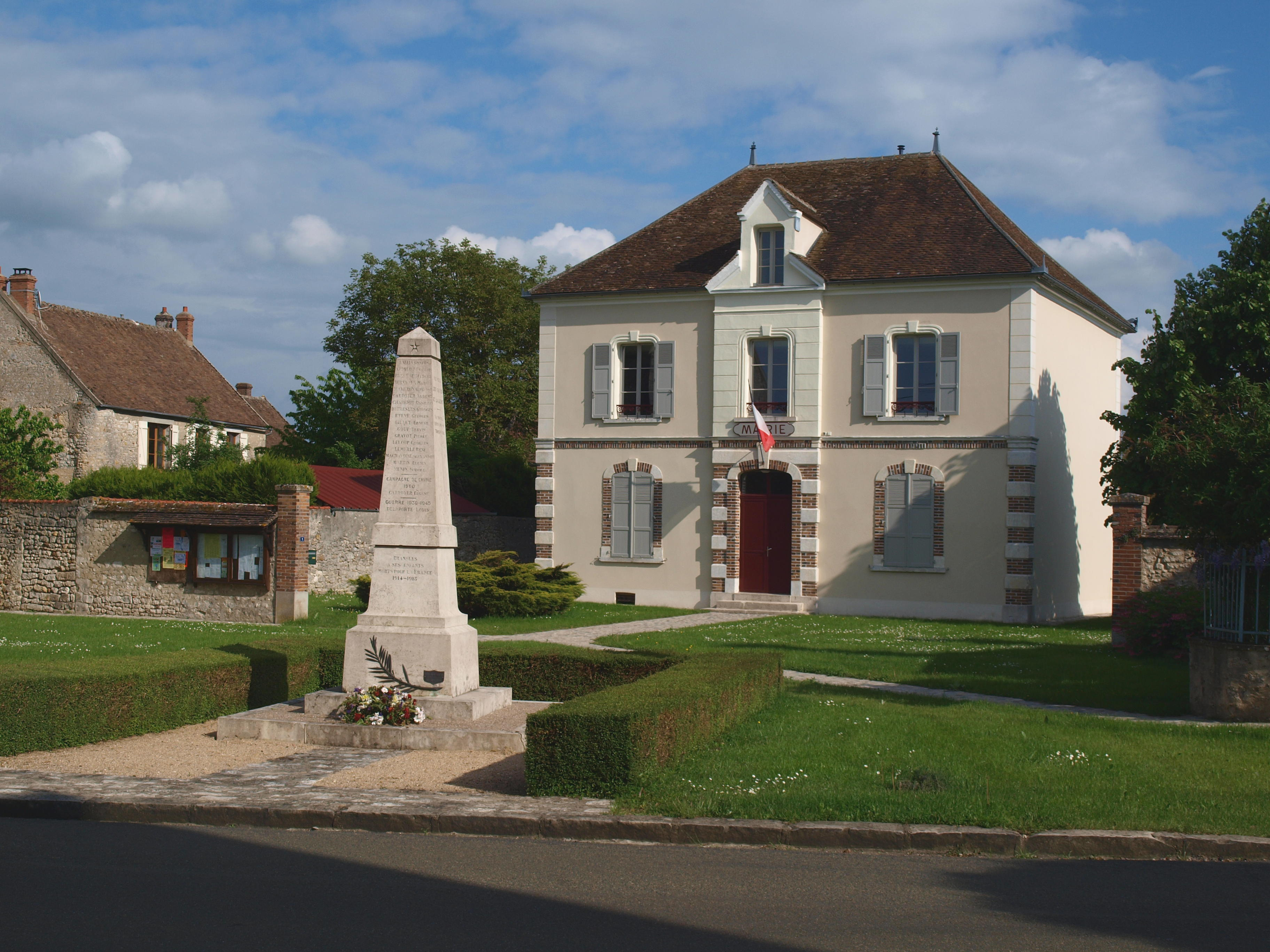
- The town hall in Bransles
- Location of Bransles
- Location within France Location within Île-de-France (region)
- Coordinates: 48°09′10″N 2°50′07″E
- Country: France
- Region: Île-de-France
- Department: Seine-et-Marne
- Arrondissement: Fontainebleau
- Canton: Nemours
- Intercommunality: CC Gâtinais-Val de Loing

Government
  - Mayor (2023–2026): Florent Negrier
- Area^{1}: 13.85 km^{2} (5.35 sq mi)
- Highest elevation: 120 m (390 ft)
- Lowest elevation: 77 m (253 ft)
- Population (2023): 526
  - Density: 38.0/km^{2} (98.4/sq mi)
- Time zone: UTC+01:00 (CET)
  - Summer (DST): UTC+02:00 (CEST)
- INSEE/Postal code: 77050 /77620
- ^{1} French Land Register data, which excludes lakes, ponds, glaciers > 1 km^{2} (0.386 sq mi or 247 acres) and river estuaries.

Bransles (French pronunciation: [bʁɑ̃l]) is a commune in the Seine-et-Marne department in the Île-de-France region in north-central France.

== Demographics ==
The inhabitants are called Branslois, Bransloises.

== See also ==
- Communes of the Seine-et-Marne department
