= La Madeleine-sur-Loing =

- Commune
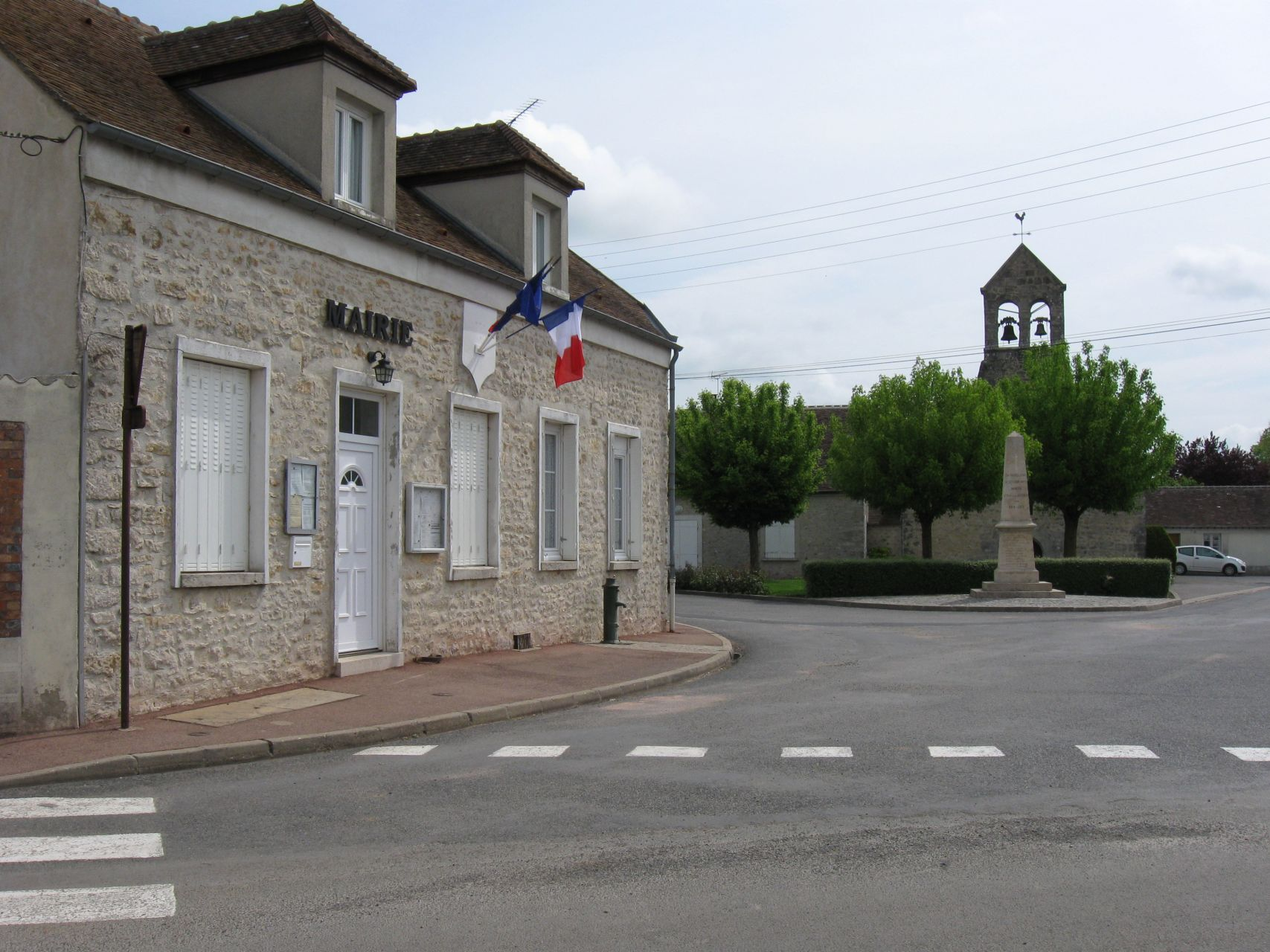
- The town hall in La Madeleine-sur-Loing
- Location of La Madeleine-sur-Loing
- Location within France Location within Île-de-France (region)
- Coordinates: 48°12′14″N 2°42′18″E
- Country: France
- Region: Île-de-France
- Department: Seine-et-Marne
- Arrondissement: Fontainebleau
- Canton: Nemours
- Intercommunality: CC Gâtinais-Val de Loing

Government
  - Mayor (2020–2026): Jean-Jacques Hyest
- Area^{1}: 6.16 km^{2} (2.38 sq mi)
- Highest elevation: 123 m (404 ft)
- Lowest elevation: 62 m (203 ft)
- Population (2023): 347
  - Density: 56.3/km^{2} (146/sq mi)
- Time zone: UTC+01:00 (CET)
  - Summer (DST): UTC+02:00 (CEST)
- INSEE/Postal code: 77267 /77570
- ^{1} French Land Register data, which excludes lakes, ponds, glaciers > 1 km^{2} (0.386 sq mi or 247 acres) and river estuaries.

La Madeleine-sur-Loing (French pronunciation: [la madlɛn syʁ lwɛ̃], literally La Madeleine on Loing) is a commune in the Seine-et-Marne department in the Île-de-France region in north-central France.

== Demographics ==
Inhabitants are called Magdaléniens.

== See also ==
- Communes of the Seine-et-Marne department
