= Mondreville, Seine-et-Marne =

Mondreville
- Commune
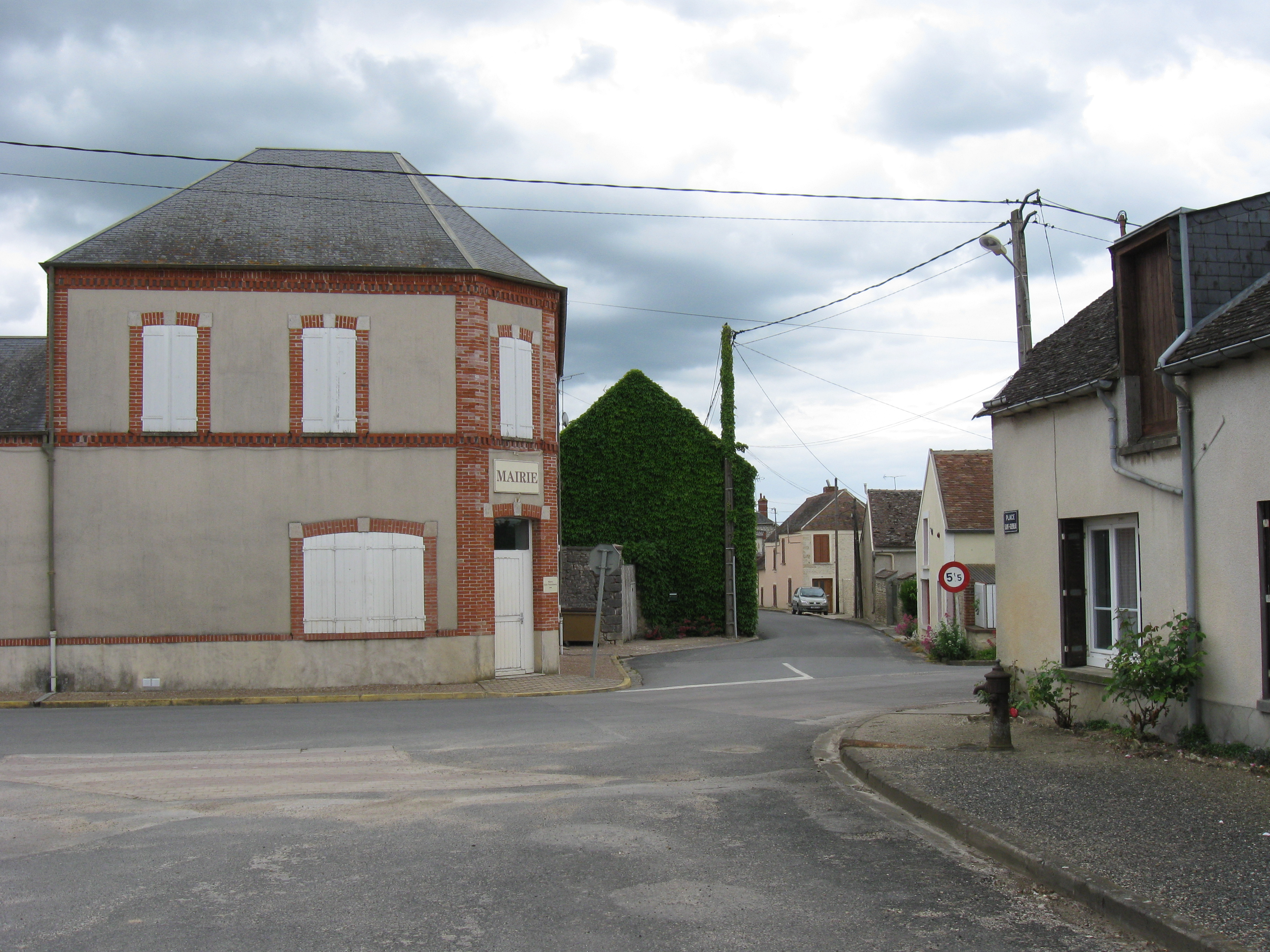
- The town hall in Mondreville

- Coat of arms
- Location of Mondreville
- Location within France Location within Île-de-France (region)
- Coordinates: 48°08′35″N 2°36′37″E
- Country: France
- Region: Île-de-France
- Department: Seine-et-Marne
- Arrondissement: Fontainebleau
- Canton: Nemours
- Intercommunality: CC Gâtinais-Val de Loing

Government
  - Mayor (2020–2026): Patrick Chaussy
- Area^{1}: 20.27 km^{2} (7.83 sq mi)
- Highest elevation: 111 m (364 ft)
- Lowest elevation: 86 m (282 ft)
- Population (2023): 334
  - Density: 16.5/km^{2} (42.7/sq mi)
- Time zone: UTC+01:00 (CET)
  - Summer (DST): UTC+02:00 (CEST)
- INSEE/Postal code: 77297 /77570
- ^{1} French Land Register data, which excludes lakes, ponds, glaciers > 1 km^{2} (0.386 sq mi or 247 acres) and river estuaries.

Mondreville (French pronunciation: [mɔ̃dʁəvil]) is a commune in the Seine-et-Marne department in the Île-de-France region in north-central France.

== Demographics ==
Inhabitants are called Mondrevillois.

== See also ==
- Communes of the Seine-et-Marne department
