= Gironville =

- Commune
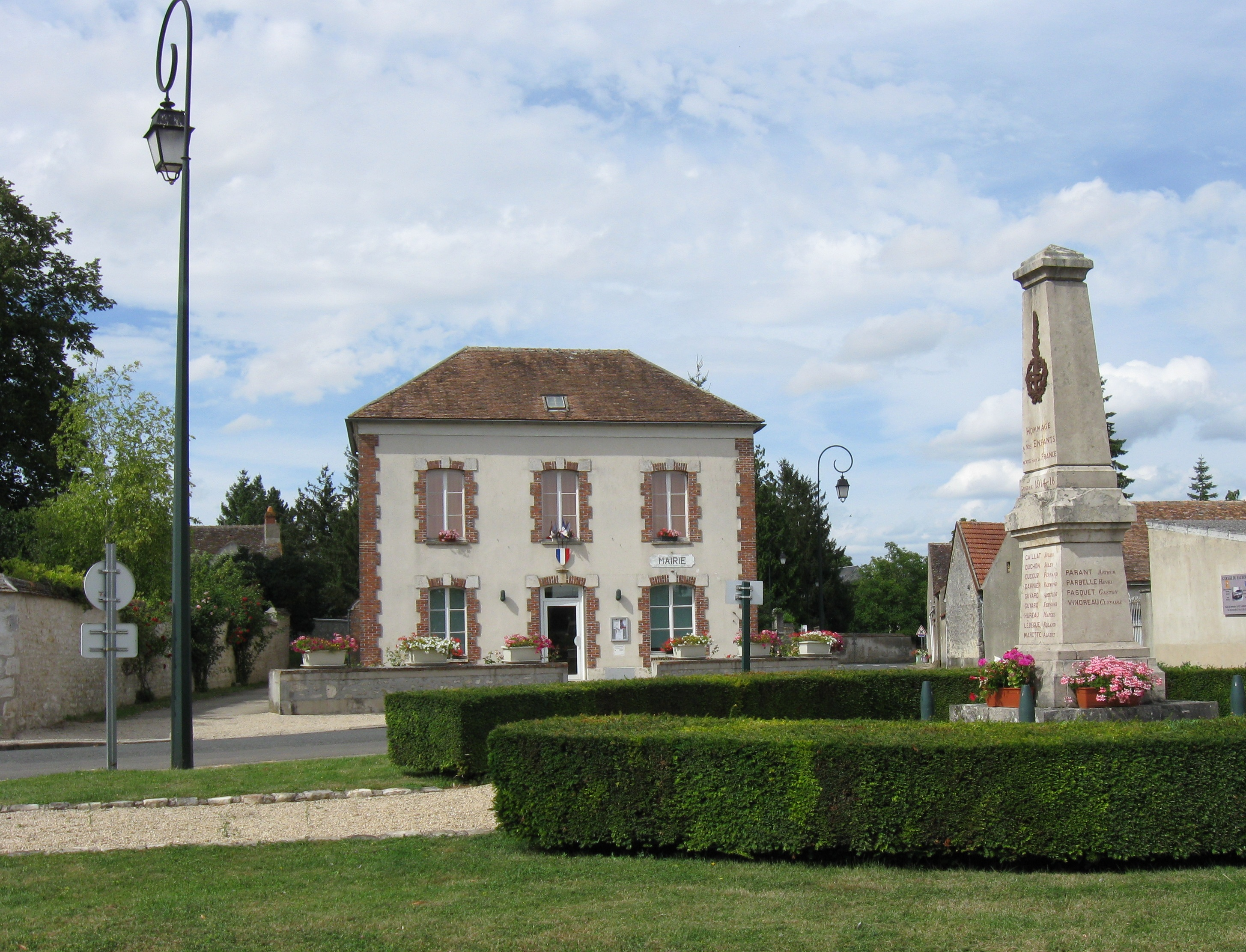
- The town hall in Gironville

- Coat of arms
- Location of Gironville
- Location within France Location within Île-de-France (region)
- Coordinates: 48°11′09″N 2°31′44″E
- Country: France
- Region: Île-de-France
- Department: Seine-et-Marne
- Arrondissement: Fontainebleau
- Canton: Nemours
- Intercommunality: CC Gâtinais-Val de Loing

Government
  - Mayor (2020–2026): Marian Watts
- Area^{1}: 13.71 km^{2} (5.29 sq mi)
- Highest elevation: 114 m (374 ft)
- Lowest elevation: 89 m (292 ft)
- Population (2023): 166
  - Density: 12.1/km^{2} (31.4/sq mi)
- Time zone: UTC+01:00 (CET)
  - Summer (DST): UTC+02:00 (CEST)
- INSEE/Postal code: 77207 /77890
- ^{1} French Land Register data, which excludes lakes, ponds, glaciers > 1 km^{2} (0.386 sq mi or 247 acres) and river estuaries.

Gironville (French pronunciation: [ʒiʁɔ̃vil]) is a commune in the Seine-et-Marne département in the Île-de-France region in north-central France.

== Demographics ==
Inhabitants are called Gironvillois.

== See also ==
- Communes of the Seine-et-Marne department
