= Ichy =

- Commune
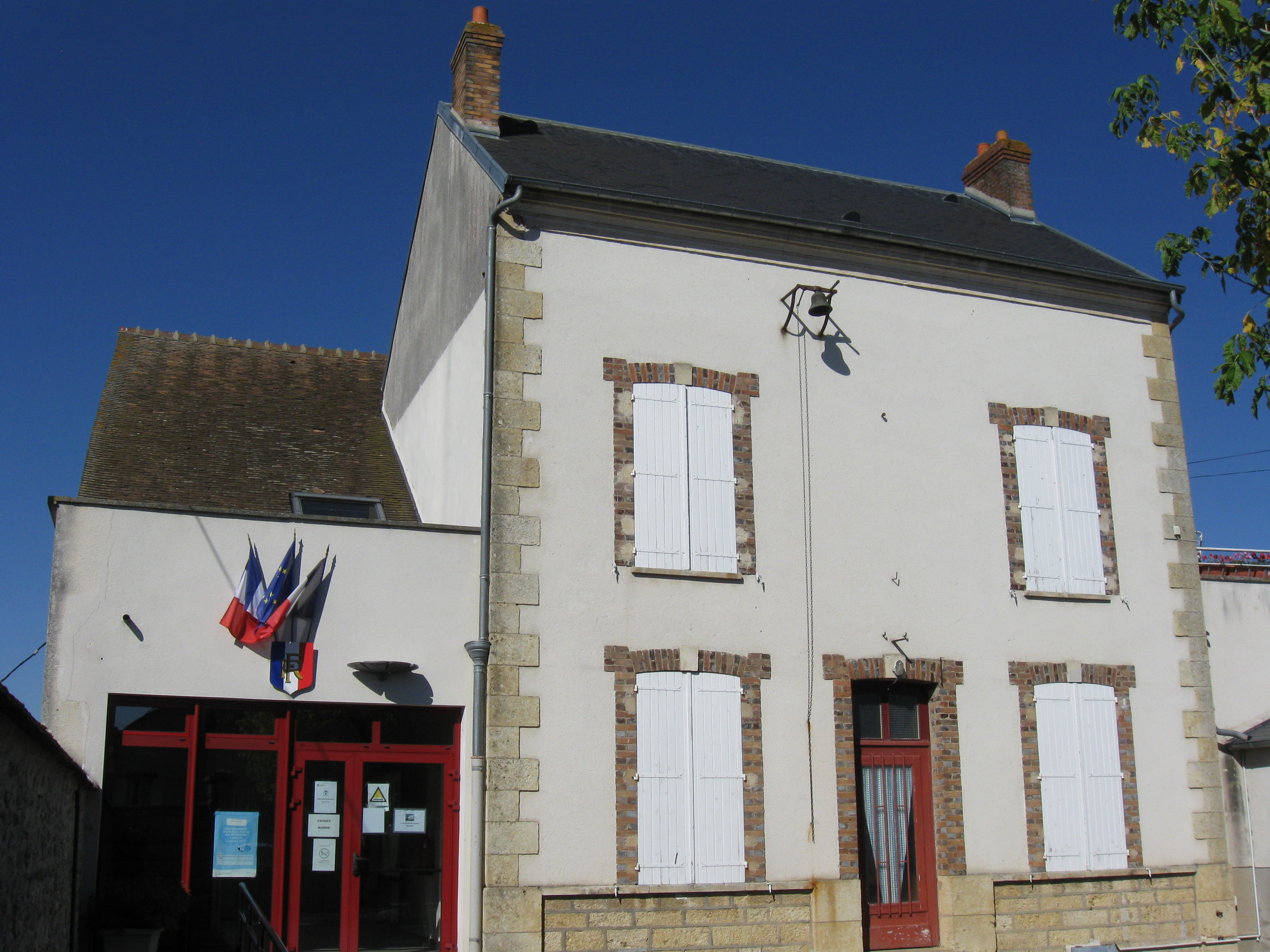
- The town hall in Ichy

- Coat of arms
- Location of Ichy
- Location within France Location within Île-de-France (region)
- Coordinates: 48°12′12″N 2°32′54″E
- Country: France
- Region: Île-de-France
- Department: Seine-et-Marne
- Arrondissement: Fontainebleau
- Canton: Nemours
- Intercommunality: Gâtinais-Val de Loing

Government
  - Mayor (2024–2026): Hervé Jacquesson
- Area^{1}: 7.80 km^{2} (3.01 sq mi)
- Highest elevation: 114 m (374 ft)
- Lowest elevation: 97 m (318 ft)
- Population (2023): 157
  - Density: 20.1/km^{2} (52.1/sq mi)
- Time zone: UTC+01:00 (CET)
  - Summer (DST): UTC+02:00 (CEST)
- INSEE/Postal code: 77230 /77890
- ^{1} French Land Register data, which excludes lakes, ponds, glaciers > 1 km^{2} (0.386 sq mi or 247 acres) and river estuaries.

Ichy (French pronunciation: [iʃi]) is a commune in the Seine-et-Marne department in the Île-de-France region in north-central France.

== Population ==
Inhabitants are called Ichiliens in French.

Historical population
Year	Pop.	±% p.a.
1968	177	—
1975	175	−0.16%
1982	138	−3.34%
1990	152	+1.22%
1999	171	+1.32%
2007	154	−1.30%
2012	183	+3.51%
2017	166	−1.93%
2023	157	−0.92%
Source: INSEE

== See also ==
- Communes of the Seine-et-Marne department
