= Beaumont-du-Gâtinais =

- Commune
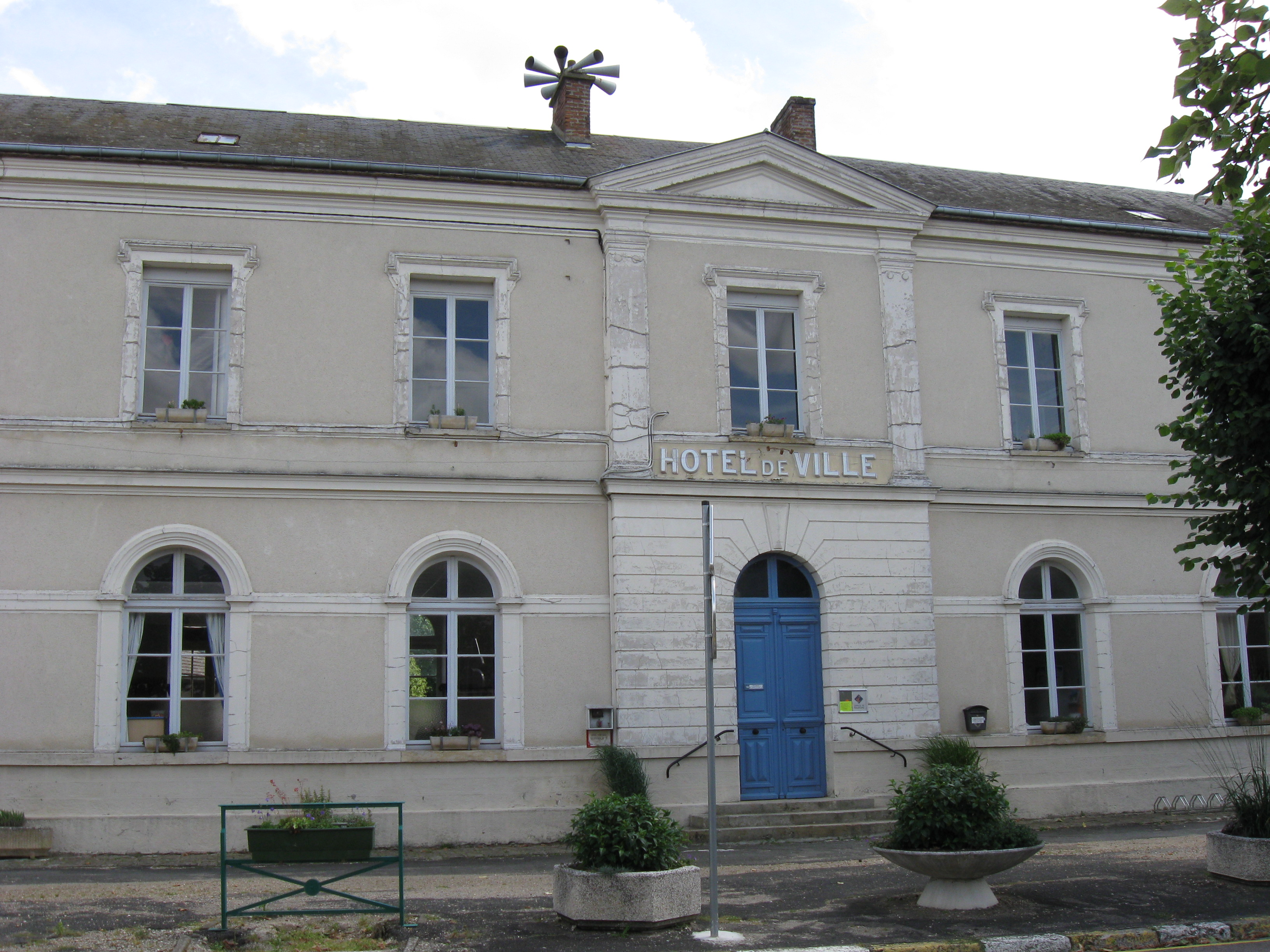
- The town hall in Beaumont-du-Gâtinais
- Location of Beaumont-du-Gâtinais
- Location within France Location within Île-de-France (region)
- Coordinates: 48°08′10″N 2°28′32″E
- Country: France
- Region: Île-de-France
- Department: Seine-et-Marne
- Arrondissement: Fontainebleau
- Canton: Nemours
- Intercommunality: CC Gâtinais-Val de Loing

Government
  - Mayor (2021–2026): Nicolas Pozo
- Area^{1}: 16.58 km^{2} (6.40 sq mi)
- Highest elevation: 114 m (374 ft)
- Lowest elevation: 83 m (272 ft)
- Population (2023): 1,129
  - Density: 68.09/km^{2} (176.4/sq mi)
- Time zone: UTC+01:00 (CET)
  - Summer (DST): UTC+02:00 (CEST)
- INSEE/Postal code: 77027 /77890
- ^{1} French Land Register data, which excludes lakes, ponds, glaciers > 1 km^{2} (0.386 sq mi or 247 acres) and river estuaries.

Beaumont-du-Gâtinais (French pronunciation: [bomɔ̃ dy ɡatinɛ], Beaumont of the Gâtinais) is a commune in the Seine-et-Marne department in the Île-de-France region in north-central France. The inhabitants are called Beaumontois.

== See also ==
- Communes of the Seine-et-Marne department
