= Aufferville =

- Commune
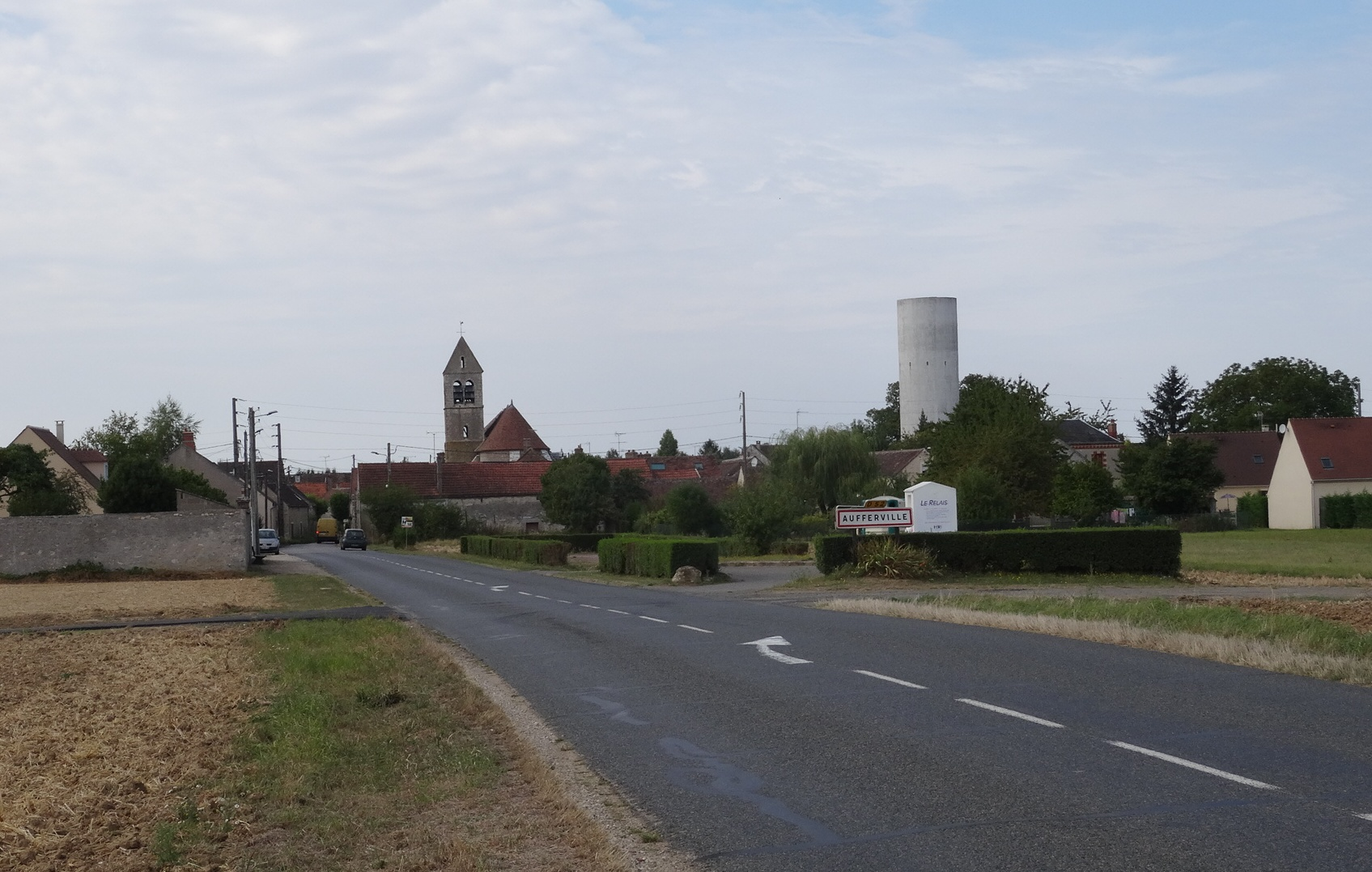
- The road into Aufferville
- Location of Aufferville
- Location within France Location within Île-de-France (region)
- Coordinates: 48°12′56″N 2°36′36″E
- Country: France
- Region: Île-de-France
- Department: Seine-et-Marne
- Arrondissement: Fontainebleau
- Canton: Nemours
- Intercommunality: CC Gâtinais-Val Loing

Government
  - Mayor (2020–2026): Bruno Moulié
- Area^{1}: 17.74 km^{2} (6.85 sq mi)
- Highest elevation: 116 m (381 ft)
- Lowest elevation: 101 m (331 ft)
- Population (2023): 482
  - Density: 27.2/km^{2} (70.4/sq mi)
- Time zone: UTC+01:00 (CET)
  - Summer (DST): UTC+02:00 (CEST)
- INSEE/Postal code: 77011 /77570
- ^{1} French Land Register data, which excludes lakes, ponds, glaciers > 1 km^{2} (0.386 sq mi or 247 acres) and river estuaries.

Aufferville (French pronunciation: [ofɛʁvil]) is a commune in the Seine-et-Marne department in the Île-de-France region in north-central France.

== Demographics ==
The inhabitants are called Auffervillois.

== See also ==
- Communes of the Seine-et-Marne department
