= Obsonville =

- Commune
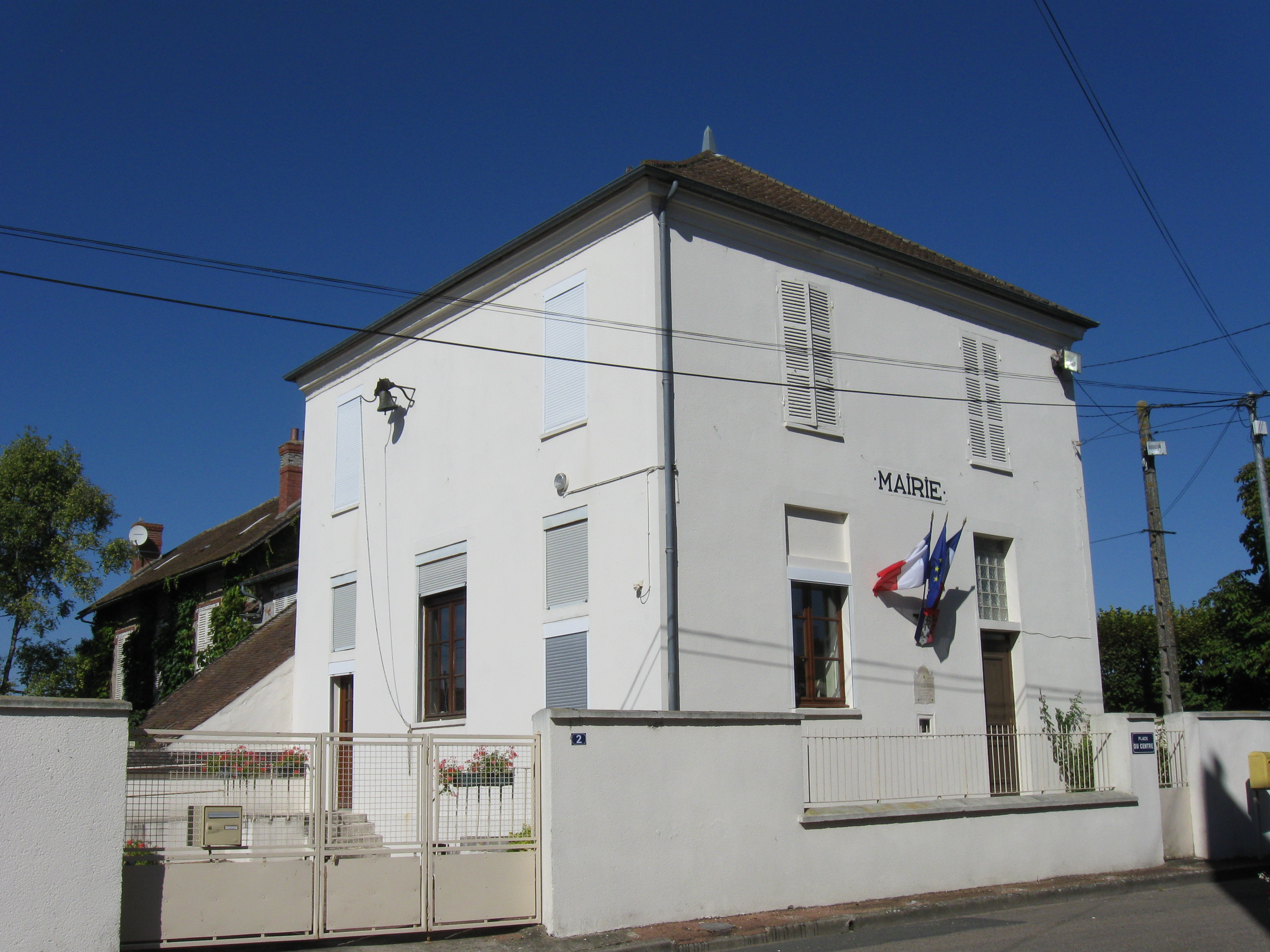
- The town hall in Obsonville

- Coat of arms
- Location of Obsonville
- Location within France Location within Île-de-France (region)
- Coordinates: 48°13′06″N 2°33′42″E
- Country: France
- Region: Île-de-France
- Department: Seine-et-Marne
- Arrondissement: Fontainebleau
- Canton: Nemours
- Intercommunality: CC Gâtinais-Val de Loing

Government
  - Mayor (2020–2026): Hélène Bridet
- Area^{1}: 7.08 km^{2} (2.73 sq mi)
- Highest elevation: 116 m (381 ft)
- Lowest elevation: 105 m (344 ft)
- Population (2023): 126
  - Density: 17.8/km^{2} (46.1/sq mi)
- Time zone: UTC+01:00 (CET)
  - Summer (DST): UTC+02:00 (CEST)
- INSEE/Postal code: 77342 /77890
- ^{1} French Land Register data, which excludes lakes, ponds, glaciers > 1 km^{2} (0.386 sq mi or 247 acres) and river estuaries.

Obsonville (French pronunciation: [ɔpsɔ̃vil]) is a commune in the Seine-et-Marne department in the Île-de-France region in north-central France. It has 114 inhabitants as of 2018.

== Demographics ==
Inhabitants are called Obsonvillois.

== See also ==
- Communes of the Seine-et-Marne department
