= Ormesson, Seine-et-Marne =

Ormesson
- Commune
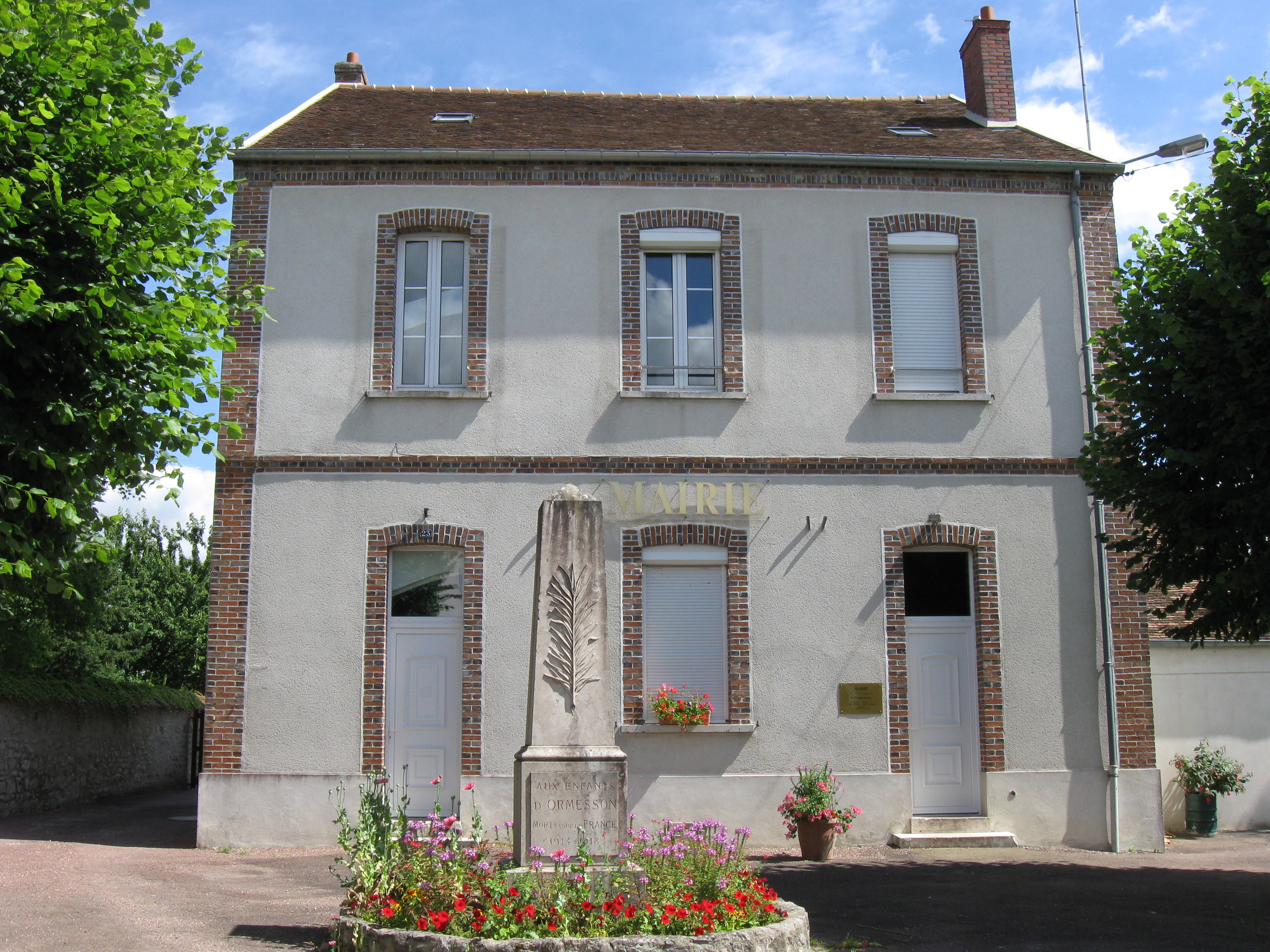
- The town hall in Ormesson

- Coat of arms
- Location of Ormesson
- Location within France Location within Île-de-France (region)
- Coordinates: 48°14′38″N 2°39′18″E
- Country: France
- Region: Île-de-France
- Department: Seine-et-Marne
- Arrondissement: Fontainebleau
- Canton: Nemours

Government
  - Mayor (2020–2026): Alain Poursin
- Area^{1}: 3.81 km^{2} (1.47 sq mi)
- Highest elevation: 119 m (390 ft)
- Lowest elevation: 70 m (230 ft)
- Population (2023): 242
  - Density: 63.5/km^{2} (165/sq mi)
- Time zone: UTC+01:00 (CET)
  - Summer (DST): UTC+02:00 (CEST)
- INSEE/Postal code: 77348 /77167
- ^{1} French Land Register data, which excludes lakes, ponds, glaciers > 1 km^{2} (0.386 sq mi or 247 acres) and river estuaries.

Ormesson (French pronunciation: [ɔʁmɛsɔ̃]) is a commune in the Seine-et-Marne department in the Île-de-France region in north-central France.

== Demographics ==
Inhabitants are called Ormessonnais.

== See also ==
- Communes of the Seine-et-Marne department
