= Arville, Seine-et-Marne =

Arville
- Commune
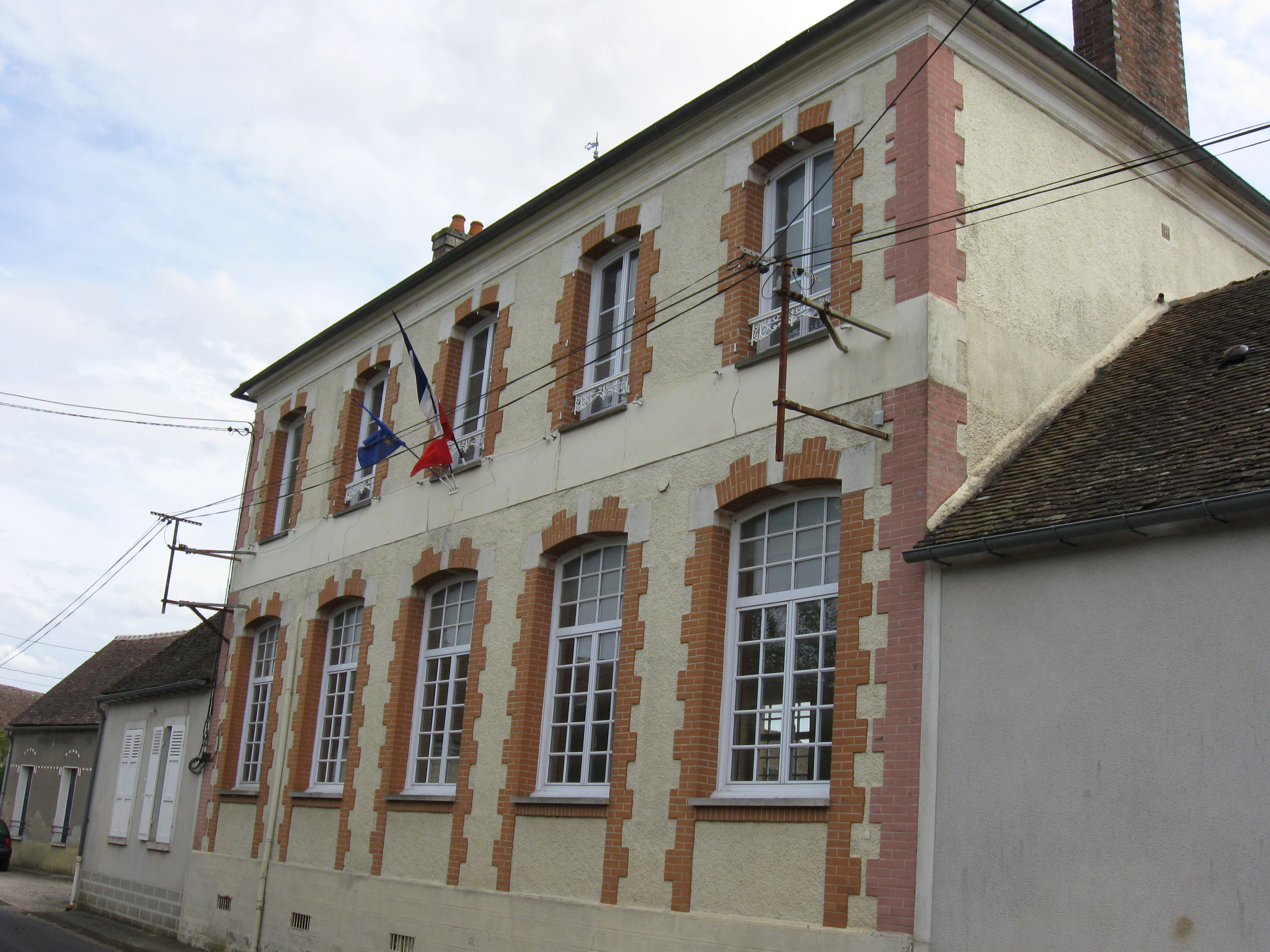
- The town hall in Arville
- Location of Arville
- Location within France Location within Île-de-France (region)
- Coordinates: 48°11′21″N 2°32′56″E
- Country: France
- Region: Île-de-France
- Department: Seine-et-Marne
- Arrondissement: Fontainebleau
- Canton: Nemours
- Intercommunality: CC Gâtinais-Val Loing

Government
  - Mayor (2020–2026): Anne Thibault
- Area^{1}: 11.30 km^{2} (4.36 sq mi)
- Highest elevation: 110 m (360 ft)
- Lowest elevation: 97 m (318 ft)
- Population (2023): 145
  - Density: 12.8/km^{2} (33.2/sq mi)
- Time zone: UTC+01:00 (CET)
  - Summer (DST): UTC+02:00 (CEST)
- INSEE/Postal code: 77009 /77890
- ^{1} French Land Register data, which excludes lakes, ponds, glaciers > 1 km^{2} (0.386 sq mi or 247 acres) and river estuaries.

Arville (French pronunciation: [aʁvil]) is a commune in the Seine-et-Marne department in the Île-de-France region in north-central France.

== Demographics ==
The inhabitants are called Arvillois.

== Bahamas ==
Many families also immigrated to the Bahamas, and carried the name "Darville" derived from "d'arville" meaning "of Arville".

== See also ==
- Communes of the Seine-et-Marne department
