= Canton of La Chapelle-la-Reine =

Coordinates: 48°18′20″N 2°31′42″E

La Chapelle-la-Reine
- Former canton
- Interactive map of La Chapelle-la-Reine
- Country: France
- Region: Île-de-France
- Department: Seine-et-Marne
- No. of communes: {{{nbcomm}}}
- Disbanded: 2015
- Area: 248.09 km^{2} (95.79 sq mi)
- Population (2012): 12,899
  - Density: 51.993/km^{2} (134.66/sq mi)

The canton of La Chapelle-la-Reine is a French former administrative division, located in the arrondissement of Fontainebleau, in the Seine-et-Marne département (Île-de-France région). It was disbanded following the French canton reorganisation which came into effect in March 2015.

== Demographics ==
Historical population
Year	Pop.	±%
1999	12,183	—
2006	12,848	+5.5%
2012	12,899	+0.4%

== Composition ==
The canton of La Chapelle-la-Reine was composed of 18 communes:

- Achères-la-Forêt
- Amponville
- Boissy-aux-Cailles
- Boulancourt
- Burcy
- Buthiers
- La Chapelle-la-Reine
- Fromont
- Guercheville
- Larchant
- Nanteau-sur-Essonne
- Noisy-sur-École
- Recloses
- Rumont
- Tousson
- Ury
- Le Vaudoué
- Villiers-sous-Grez

== See also ==
- Cantons of the Seine-et-Marne department
- Communes of the Seine-et-Marne department
