= Communauté de communes du Pays de Bière =

Coordinates: 48.4989°N 2.5421°E

Pays de Bière
- Former communauté de communes
- Country: France
- Region: Île-de-France
- Department: Seine-et-Marne
- No. of communes: {{{nbcomm}}}
- Established: 2001
- Disbanded: 2017
- Area: 94.13 km^{2} (36.34 sq mi)
- Population (1999): 10,454
  - Density: 111.1/km^{2} (287.6/sq mi)

The Communauté de communes du Pays de Bière is a former federation of municipalities (communauté de communes) in the Seine-et-Marne département and in the Île-de-France région of France. It was created in November 2001. It was dissolved in January 2017, when most of its communes joined the new Communauté d'agglomération du Pays de Fontainebleau.

== Composition ==
The Communauté de communes comprised the following communes:

- Arbonne-la-Forêt
- Barbizon
- Cély
- Chailly-en-Bière
- Fleury-en-Bière
- Perthes
- Saint-Germain-sur-École
- Saint-Martin-en-Bière
- Saint-Sauveur-sur-École
- Villiers-en-Bière

== See also ==
- Communes of the Seine-et-Marne department
