= Canton of Perthes =

Coordinates: 48°30′40″N 2°34′05″E

Perthes
- Former canton
- Interactive map of Perthes
- Country: France
- Region: Île-de-France
- Department: Seine-et-Marne
- No. of communes: {{{nbcomm}}}
- Disbanded: 2015
- Area: 132.47 km^{2} (51.15 sq mi)
- Population (2012): 51,066
  - Density: 385.49/km^{2} (998.42/sq mi)

The canton of Perthes is a French former administrative division, located in the arrondissement of Melun, in the Seine-et-Marne département (Île-de-France région). It was disbanded following the French canton reorganisation which came into effect in March 2015.

== Demographics ==
Historical population
Year	Pop.	±%
1999	48,196	—
2006	49,843	+3.4%
2012	51,066	+2.5%

== Composition ==
The canton of Perthes was composed of 14 communes:

- Arbonne-la-Forêt
- Barbizon
- Boissise-le-Roi
- Cély
- Chailly-en-Bière
- Dammarie-les-Lys
- Fleury-en-Bière
- Perthes
- Pringy
- Saint-Fargeau-Ponthierry
- Saint-Germain-sur-École
- Saint-Martin-en-Bière
- Saint-Sauveur-sur-École
- Villiers-en-Bière

== See also ==
- Cantons of the Seine-et-Marne department
- Communes of the Seine-et-Marne department
