= Communauté de communes entre Seine et Forêt =

Coordinates: 48.4218°N 2.7526°E

entre Seine et Forêt
- Former communauté de communes
- Country: France
- Region: Île-de-France
- Department: Seine-et-Marne
- No. of communes: {{{nbcomm}}}
- Established: December 2001
- Disbanded: 2017
- Area: 21.01 km^{2} (8.11 sq mi)
- Population (1999): 6,886
  - Density: 327.7/km^{2} (848.9/sq mi)

The Communauté de communes entre Seine et Forêt is a former federation of municipalities (communauté de communes) in the Seine-et-Marne département and in the Île-de-France région of France. It was created in December 2001. It was merged into the new Communauté d'agglomération du Pays de Fontainebleau in January 2017.

== Composition ==
The Communauté de communes comprised the following communes:

- Héricy
- Samoreau
- Vulaines-sur-Seine

== See also ==
- Communes of the Seine-et-Marne department
