= Canton of Fontainebleau =

Coordinates: 48°26′05″N 2°44′14″E

Fontainebleau
- Canton
- Country: France
- Region: Île-de-France
- Department: Seine-et-Marne
- No. of communes: {{{nbcomm}}}
- Area: 528.28 km^{2} (203.97 sq mi)
- Population (2023): 64,055
  - Density: 121.25/km^{2} (314.04/sq mi)
- INSEE code: 77 07

The canton of Fontainebleau is a French administrative division, located in the arrondissement of Fontainebleau, in the Seine-et-Marne département (Île-de-France région).

== Demographics ==
Historical population
Year	Pop.	±% p.a.
2013	63,708	—
2018	63,538	−0.05%
Source: INSEE

== Composition ==
At the French canton reorganisation which came into effect in March 2015, the canton was expanded from 7 to 34 communes:

- Achères-la-Forêt
- Amponville
- Arbonne-la-Forêt
- Avon
- Barbizon
- Boissy-aux-Cailles
- Boulancourt
- Bourron-Marlotte
- Burcy
- Buthiers
- Cély
- Chailly-en-Bière
- La Chapelle-la-Reine
- Fleury-en-Bière
- Fontainebleau
- Fromont
- Guercheville
- Héricy
- Nanteau-sur-Essonne
- Noisy-sur-École
- Perthes
- Recloses
- Rumont
- Saint-Germain-sur-École
- Saint-Martin-en-Bière
- Saint-Sauveur-sur-École
- Samois-sur-Seine
- Samoreau
- Tousson
- Ury
- Le Vaudoué
- Villiers-en-Bière
- Villiers-sous-Grez
- Vulaines-sur-Seine

== See also ==
- Communes of the Seine-et-Marne department
- Cantons of the Seine-et-Marne department
