= Ury, Seine-et-Marne =

Ury
- Commune
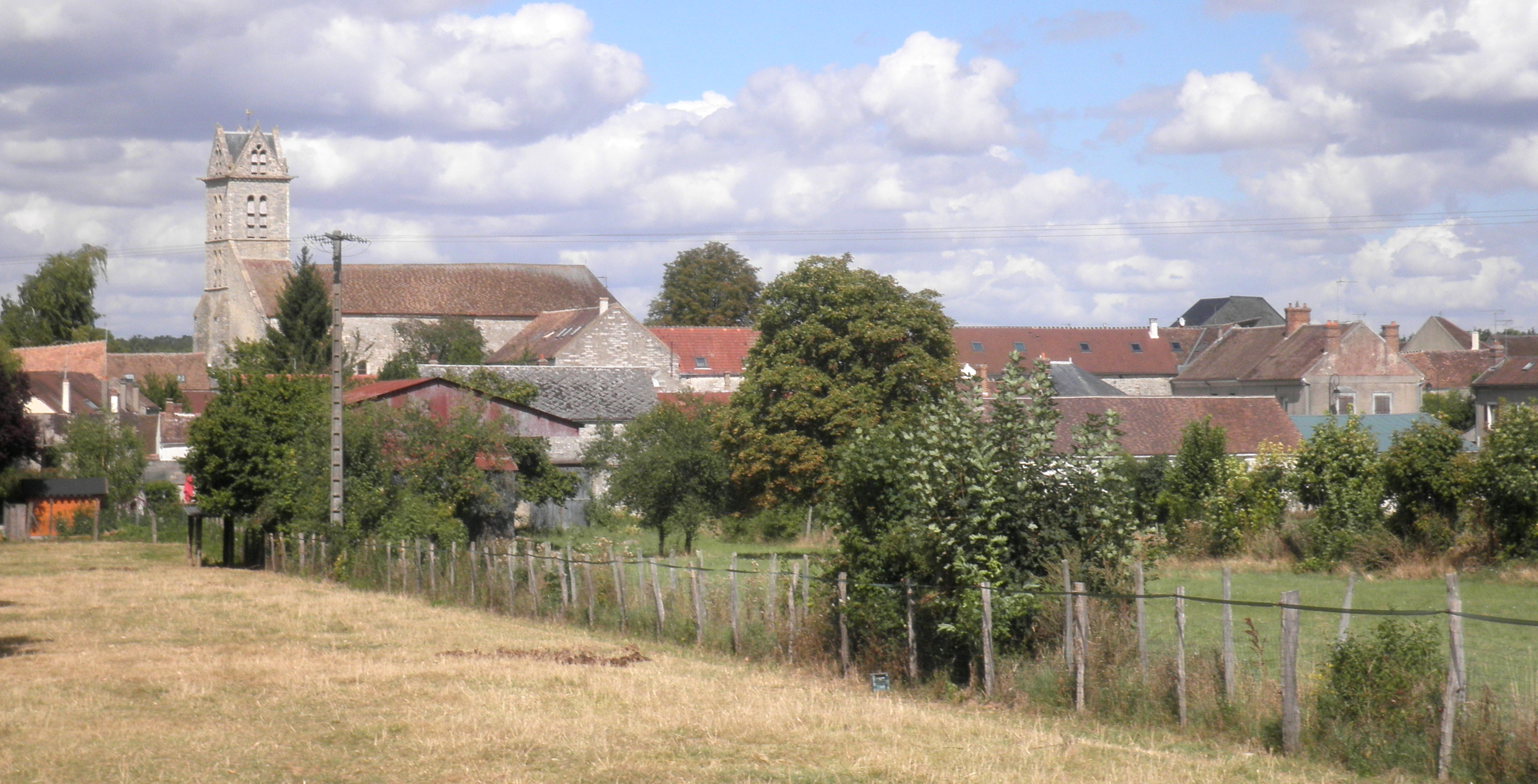
- The village of Ury
- Location of Ury
- Location within France Location within Île-de-France (region)
- Coordinates: 48°20′39″N 2°36′16″E
- Country: France
- Region: Île-de-France
- Department: Seine-et-Marne
- Arrondissement: Fontainebleau
- Canton: Fontainebleau
- Intercommunality: CA Pays de Fontainebleau

Government
  - Mayor (2020–2026): Jean-Philippe Pommeret
- Area^{1}: 8.21 km^{2} (3.17 sq mi)
- Highest elevation: 130 m (430 ft)
- Lowest elevation: 108 m (354 ft)
- Population (2023): 882
  - Density: 107/km^{2} (278/sq mi)
- Time zone: UTC+01:00 (CET)
  - Summer (DST): UTC+02:00 (CEST)
- INSEE/Postal code: 77477 /77760
- ^{1} French Land Register data, which excludes lakes, ponds, glaciers > 1 km^{2} (0.386 sq mi or 247 acres) and river estuaries.

Ury (French pronunciation: [yʁi]) is a commune in the Seine-et-Marne department in the Île-de-France region in north-central France.

== Demographics ==
Inhabitants of Ury are called Uriquois.

== See also ==
- Communes of the Seine-et-Marne department
