= Communauté d'agglomération du Pays de Fontainebleau =

Coordinates: 48.41°N 2.70°E

Pays de Fontainebleau
- Communauté d'agglomération
- Country: France
- Region: Île-de-France
- Department: Seine-et-Marne
- No. of communes: {{{nbcomm}}}
- Established: January 2017

Government
  - President: Pascal Gouhoury
- Area: 437.4 km^{2} (168.9 sq mi)
- Population (2018): 68,480
  - Density: 156.6/km^{2} (405.5/sq mi)

The Communauté d'agglomération du Pays de Fontainebleau is a communauté d'agglomération in the Seine-et-Marne département and in the Île-de-France région of France. It was formed in January 2017 by the merger of the former Communauté de communes du pays de Fontainebleau, the Communauté de communes entre Seine et Forêt and several communes from other communities. Its area is 437.4 km^{2}. Its population was 68,480 in 2018, of which 15,407 in Fontainebleau proper.

== Composition ==
It includes 26 communes:

1. Achères-la-Forêt
2. Arbonne-la-Forêt
3. Avon
4. Barbizon
5. Bois-le-Roi
6. Boissy-aux-Cailles
7. Bourron-Marlotte
8. Cély
9. Chailly-en-Bière
10. La Chapelle-la-Reine
11. Chartrettes
12. Fleury-en-Bière
13. Fontainebleau
14. Héricy
15. Noisy-sur-École
16. Perthes
17. Recloses
18. Saint-Germain-sur-École
19. Saint-Martin-en-Bière
20. Saint-Sauveur-sur-École
21. Samois-sur-Seine
22. Samoreau
23. Tousson
24. Ury
25. Le Vaudoué
26. Vulaines-sur-Seine
