= Le Vaudoué =

- Commune
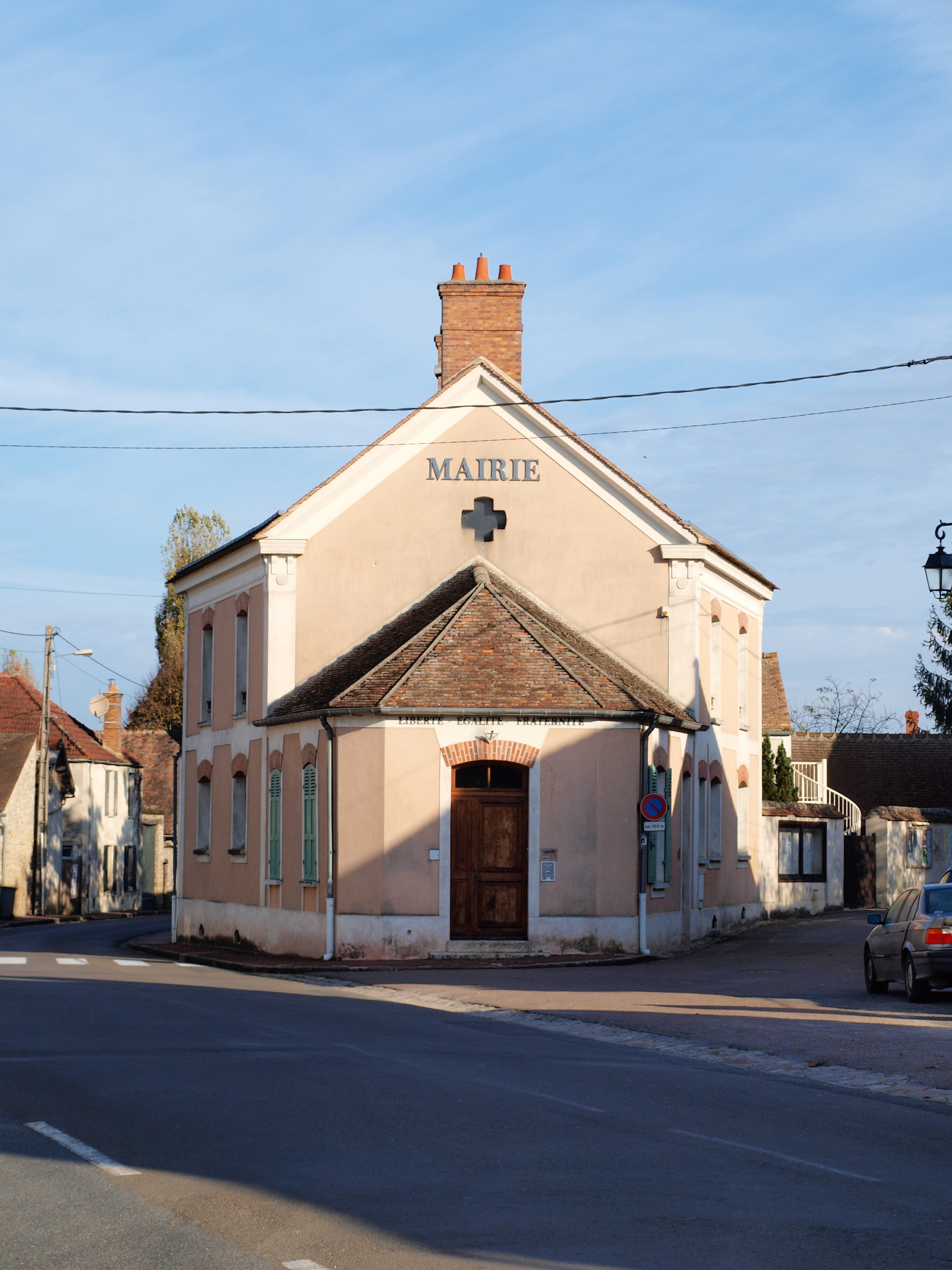
- The town hall in Le Vaudoué

- Coat of arms
- Location of Le Vaudoué
- Location within France Location within Île-de-France (region)
- Coordinates: 48°21′28″N 2°31′11″E
- Country: France
- Region: Île-de-France
- Department: Seine-et-Marne
- Arrondissement: Fontainebleau
- Canton: Fontainebleau
- Intercommunality: CA Pays de Fontainebleau

Government
  - Mayor (2020–2026): Michel Calmy
- Area^{1}: 17.16 km^{2} (6.63 sq mi)
- Highest elevation: 123 m (404 ft)
- Lowest elevation: 66 m (217 ft)
- Population (2023): 731
  - Density: 42.6/km^{2} (110/sq mi)
- Time zone: UTC+01:00 (CET)
  - Summer (DST): UTC+02:00 (CEST)
- INSEE/Postal code: 77485 /77123
- ^{1} French Land Register data, which excludes lakes, ponds, glaciers > 1 km^{2} (0.386 sq mi or 247 acres) and river estuaries.

Le Vaudoué (French pronunciation: [lə vodwe]) is a commune in the Seine-et-Marne department in the Île-de-France region in north-central France.

== Demographics ==
Inhabitants of Le Vaudoué are called Valdéens. 2013: 772 hab

== See also ==
- Communes of the Seine-et-Marne department
