= Boulancourt =

- Commune
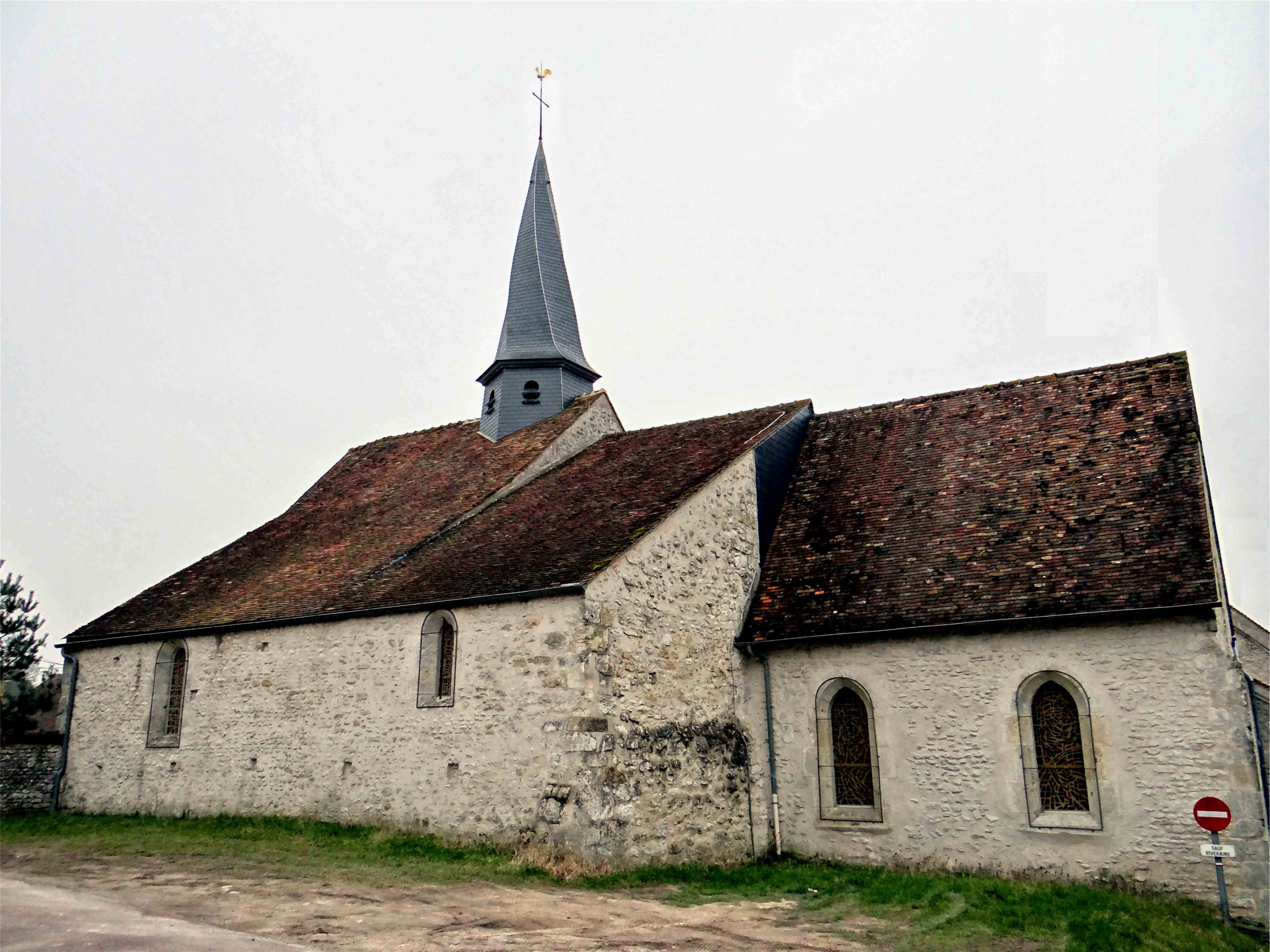
- The church in Boulancourt
- Location of Boulancourt
- Location within France Location within Île-de-France (region)
- Coordinates: 48°15′34″N 2°26′18″E
- Country: France
- Region: Île-de-France
- Department: Seine-et-Marne
- Arrondissement: Fontainebleau
- Canton: Fontainebleau

Government
  - Mayor (2020–2026): Eric Jaire
- Area^{1}: 6.44 km^{2} (2.49 sq mi)
- Highest elevation: 117 m (384 ft)
- Lowest elevation: 72 m (236 ft)
- Population (2023): 350
  - Density: 54/km^{2} (140/sq mi)
- Time zone: UTC+01:00 (CET)
  - Summer (DST): UTC+02:00 (CEST)
- INSEE/Postal code: 77046 /77760
- ^{1} French Land Register data, which excludes lakes, ponds, glaciers > 1 km^{2} (0.386 sq mi or 247 acres) and river estuaries.

Boulancourt (French pronunciation: [bulɑ̃kuʁ]) is a commune in the Seine-et-Marne department in the Île-de-France region. The inhabitants are known as Boulancourtois in French.

== See also ==
- Communes of the Seine-et-Marne department
