= Rumont, Seine-et-Marne =

Rumont
- Commune
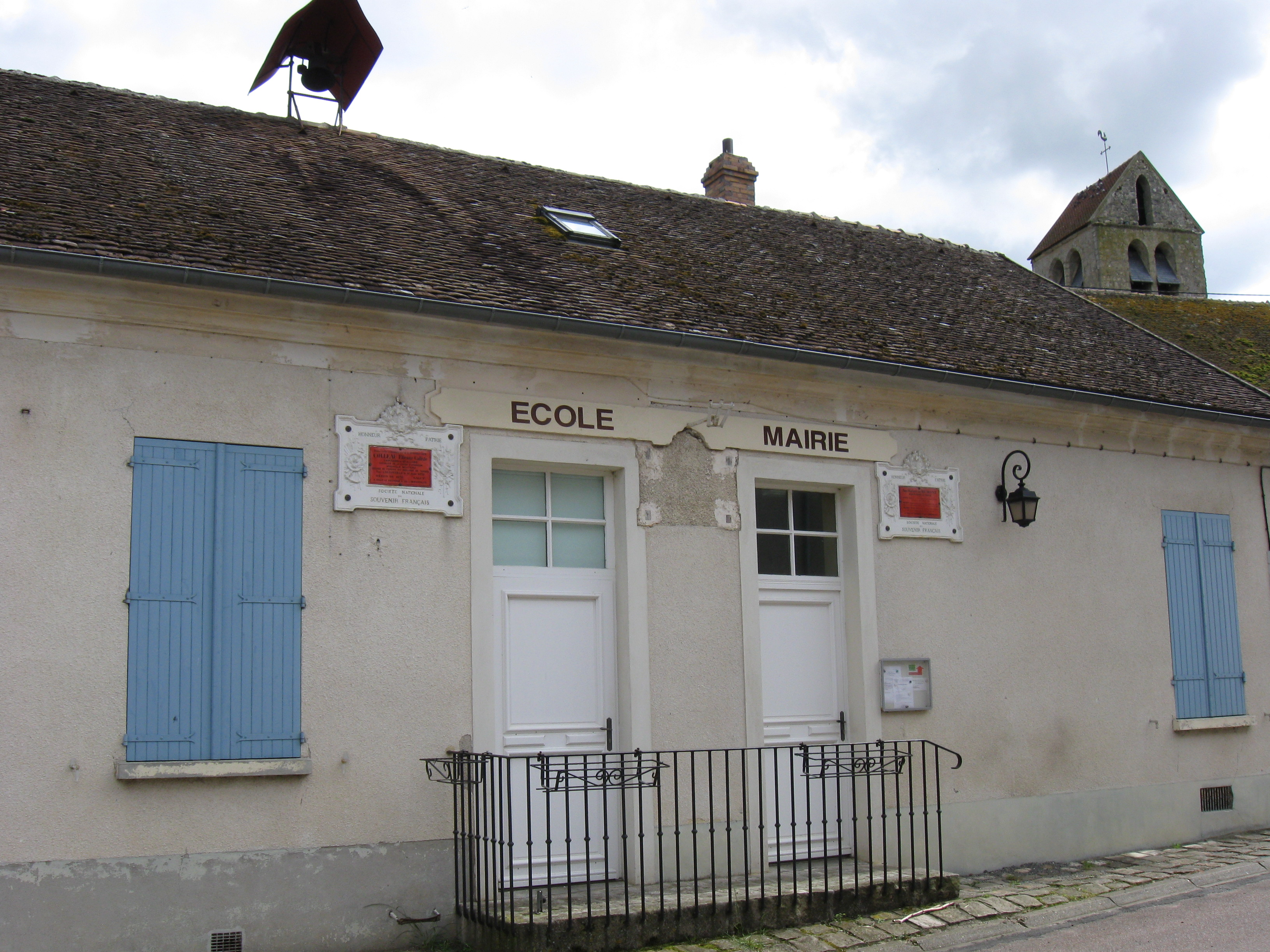
- The town hall in Rumont

- Coat of arms
- Location of Rumont
- Location within France Location within Île-de-France (region)
- Coordinates: 48°15′56″N 2°29′56″E
- Country: France
- Region: Île-de-France
- Department: Seine-et-Marne
- Arrondissement: Fontainebleau
- Canton: Fontainebleau

Government
  - Mayor (2022–2026): Mehdi Rezgallah
- Area^{1}: 6.61 km^{2} (2.55 sq mi)
- Highest elevation: 142 m (466 ft)
- Lowest elevation: 106 m (348 ft)
- Population (2023): 125
  - Density: 18.9/km^{2} (49.0/sq mi)
- Time zone: UTC+01:00 (CET)
  - Summer (DST): UTC+02:00 (CEST)
- INSEE/Postal code: 77395 /77760
- ^{1} French Land Register data, which excludes lakes, ponds, glaciers > 1 km^{2} (0.386 sq mi or 247 acres) and river estuaries.

Rumont (French pronunciation: [ʁymɔ̃]) is a commune in the Seine-et-Marne department in the Île-de-France region in north-central France.

== Demographics ==
Inhabitants of Rumont are called Rumontois.

== See also ==
- Communes of the Seine-et-Marne department
