= Villiers-sous-Grez =

- Commune
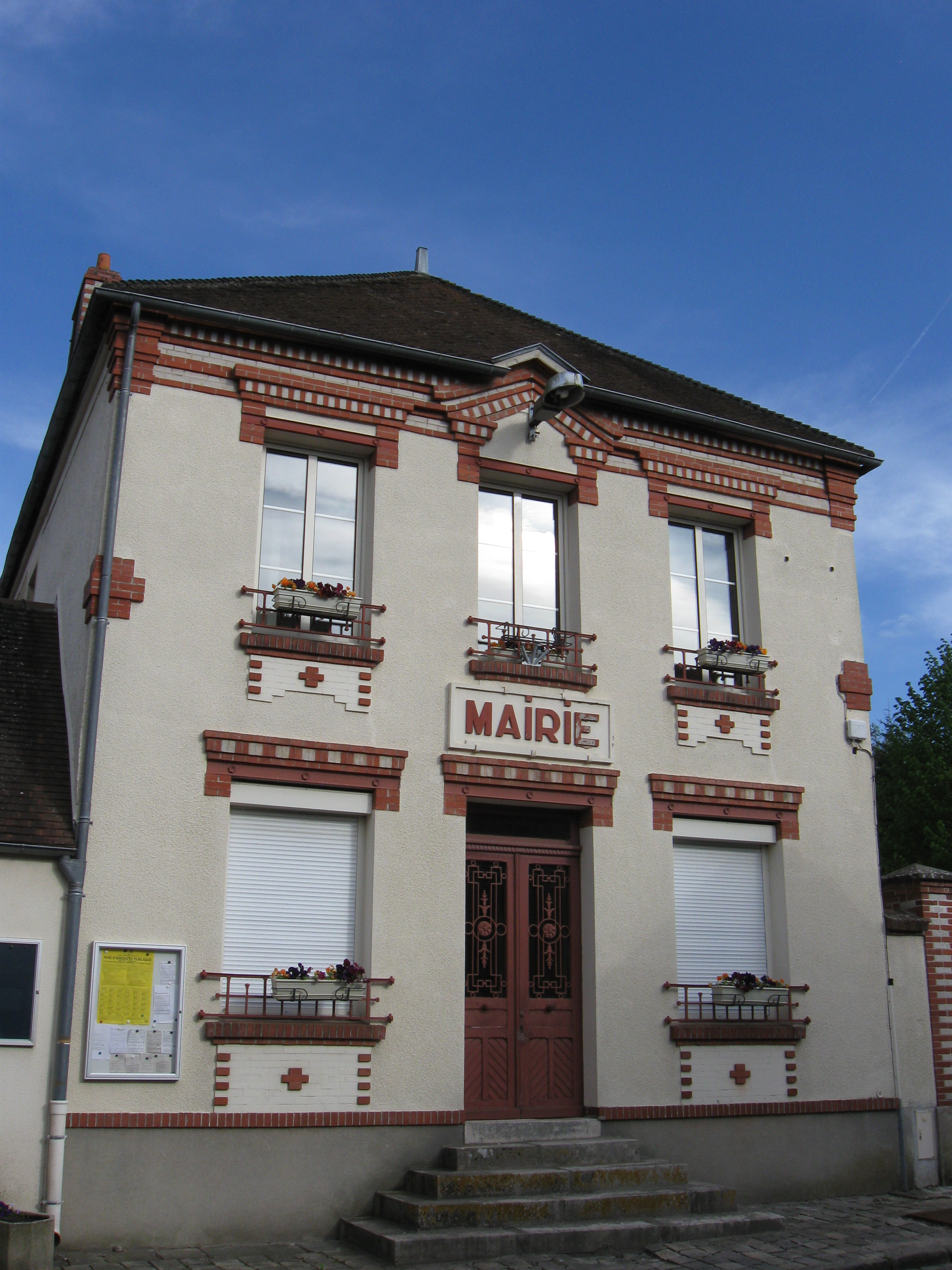
- The town hall in Villiers-sous-Grez
- Location of Villiers-sous-Grez
- Location within France Location within Île-de-France (region)
- Coordinates: 48°19′13″N 2°38′56″E
- Country: France
- Region: Île-de-France
- Department: Seine-et-Marne
- Arrondissement: Fontainebleau
- Canton: Fontainebleau

Government
  - Mayor (2020–2026): Thierry Masson
- Area^{1}: 12.25 km^{2} (4.73 sq mi)
- Highest elevation: 133 m (436 ft)
- Lowest elevation: 65 m (213 ft)
- Population (2023): 706
  - Density: 57.6/km^{2} (149/sq mi)
- Time zone: UTC+01:00 (CET)
  - Summer (DST): UTC+02:00 (CEST)
- INSEE/Postal code: 77520 /77760
- ^{1} French Land Register data, which excludes lakes, ponds, glaciers > 1 km^{2} (0.386 sq mi or 247 acres) and river estuaries.

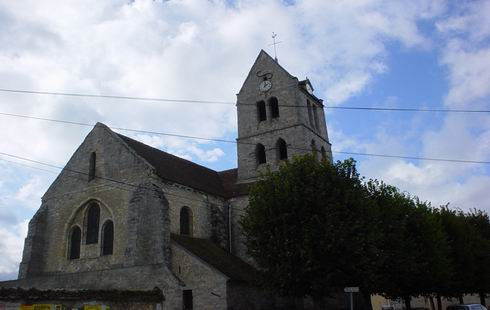
The church Eglise Saint Etienne, built in 13th century

Villiers-sous-Grez (French pronunciation: [vilje su ɡʁe]) is a commune in the Seine-et-Marne department in the Île-de-France region in north-central France.

== Demographics ==
Inhabitants of Villiers-sous-Grez are called Villarons.

== See also ==
- Communes of the Seine-et-Marne department
