= Boissy-aux-Cailles =

- Commune
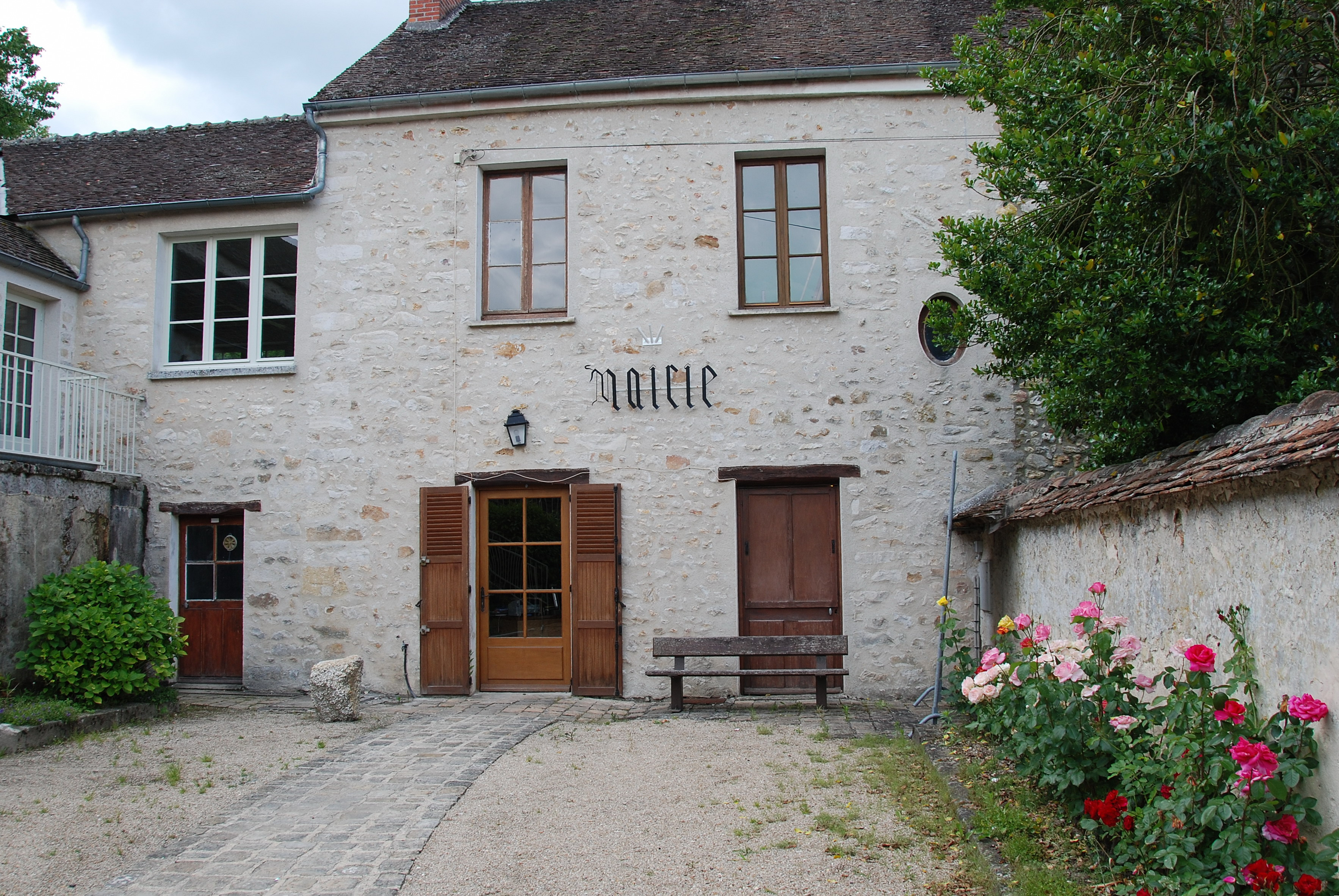
- The town hall in Boissy-aux-Cailles
- Location of Boissy-aux-Cailles
- Location within France Location within Île-de-France (region)
- Coordinates: 48°19′13″N 2°30′15″E
- Country: France
- Region: Île-de-France
- Department: Seine-et-Marne
- Arrondissement: Fontainebleau
- Canton: Fontainebleau
- Intercommunality: CA Pays de Fontainebleau

Government
  - Mayor (2020–2026): Patrick Pochon
- Area^{1}: 16.10 km^{2} (6.22 sq mi)
- Highest elevation: 123 m (404 ft)
- Lowest elevation: 71 m (233 ft)
- Population (2023): 272
  - Density: 16.9/km^{2} (43.8/sq mi)
- Time zone: UTC+01:00 (CET)
  - Summer (DST): UTC+02:00 (CEST)
- INSEE/Postal code: 77041 /77760
- ^{1} French Land Register data, which excludes lakes, ponds, glaciers > 1 km^{2} (0.386 sq mi or 247 acres) and river estuaries.

Boissy-aux-Cailles (French pronunciation: [bwasi o kaj]) is a commune in the Seine-et-Marne department in the Île-de-France region.

== Demographics ==
The inhabitants are called the Boisséens.

== See also ==
- Communes of the Seine-et-Marne department
