= Samoreau =

- Commune
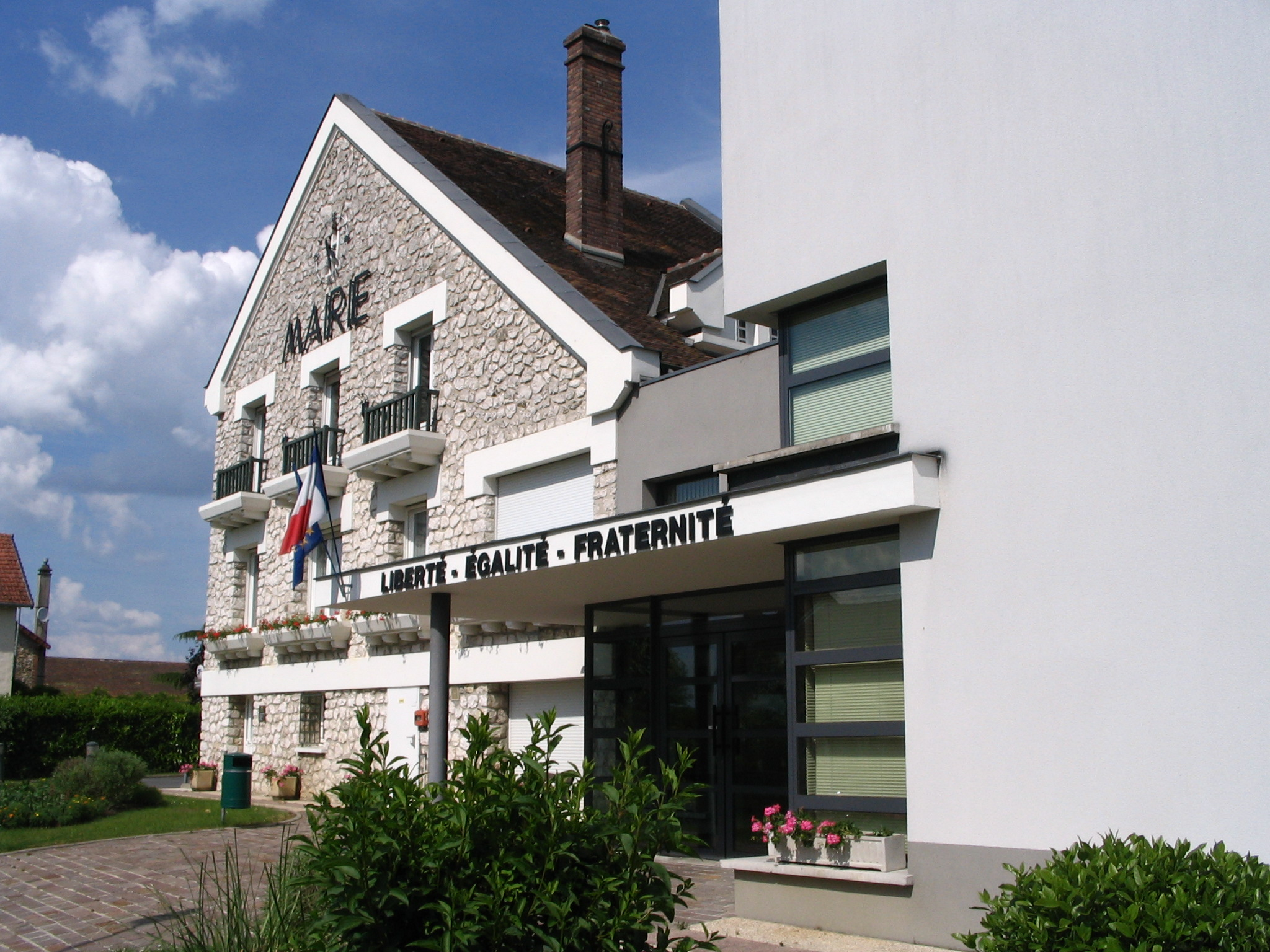
- The town hall in Samoreau
- Location of Samoreau
- Location within France Location within Île-de-France (region)
- Coordinates: 48°25′34″N 2°45′18″E
- Country: France
- Region: Île-de-France
- Department: Seine-et-Marne
- Arrondissement: Fontainebleau
- Canton: Fontainebleau
- Intercommunality: CA Pays de Fontainebleau

Government
  - Mayor (2020–2026): Pascal Gouhoury
- Area^{1}: 5.65 km^{2} (2.18 sq mi)
- Highest elevation: 147 m (482 ft)
- Lowest elevation: 41 m (135 ft)
- Population (2023): 2,384
  - Density: 422/km^{2} (1,090/sq mi)
- Time zone: UTC+01:00 (CET)
  - Summer (DST): UTC+02:00 (CEST)
- INSEE/Postal code: 77442 /77210
- ^{1} French Land Register data, which excludes lakes, ponds, glaciers > 1 km^{2} (0.386 sq mi or 247 acres) and river estuaries.

Samoreau (French pronunciation: [samɔʁo]) is a commune in the Seine-et-Marne department in the Île-de-France region in north-central France.

== Population ==
Historical population
Year	Pop.	±% p.a.
1968	887	—
1975	1,304	+5.66%
1982	1,626	+3.20%
1990	1,856	+1.67%
1999	2,157	+1.68%
2007	2,341	+1.03%
2012	2,317	−0.21%
2017	2,308	−0.08%
2023	2,384	+0.54%
Source: INSEE

Inhabitants of Samoreau are called Samoréens in French.

== Notable people ==
- Matthias Blazek, German local historian and journalist, lived as a member of the German Military Delegation in France in the village from 1994 to 1999
- Jean-Pierre Lacloche, French writer, buried in the cemetery of Samoreau
- Olivier Larronde, French poet, buried in the cemetery of Samoreau
- Stéphane Mallarmé, French poet and critic, buried in the cemetery of Samoreau (next to his son Anatole)
- Bernard Baissait graphic design born in 1948
- Misia Sert, buried in the cemetery of Samoreau in 1950.

== See also ==
- Communes of the Seine-et-Marne department

== Bibliography ==
- René Clément-Bayer, Alain Nicol, Cécile and Jean-Pierre Thibieroz: Samoreau. Samoreau 1978
- Pierre Grassat: La Libération de Samoreau 23–25 août 1944 – Récit d'un témoin. Samoreau 1996
- Pierre Grassat and Matthias Blazek: Pompes à bras et pompiers à Samoreau: L'Historique des Sapeurs-Pompiers de Samoreau 1898–1982. Introduced by Patrice Havard, Samoreau 1997
- Georges Guillory: Vulaines – Samoreau – Héricy, éditions Amatteis, Le Mée-sur-Seine 1993 ISBN 2-86849-127-8
- Les Amis de Samois sur Seine: Valvins. Les Cahiers Samoisiens, Nr. 14/1993, Samois sur Seine 1993 ISSN 0338-120X
- Alain Nicol and Matthias Blazek: L'Histoire de la Grange aux Dîmes. Samoreau 1998
- Étienne Pivert de Sénancour and George Sand: Obermann. Paris 1863, p. 97
- Marie-Anne Sarda: Stéphane Mallarmé à Valvins. Livre du visiteur, Musée départemental Stéphane Mallarmé, Vulaines-sur-Seine 1995 ISBN 2-911389-00-X
- René Clément-Bayer, Alain Nicol, Cécile and Jean-Pierre Thibieroz: La Mémoire d'un Village 1177–1987. Exhibition catalogue, exposition about the history of Samoreau, Samoreau 1987
- Comité de Jumelage Samoreau/Bernried: Bulletins No 1–4, Samoreau 1996–1999
- Prussia: Der deutsch-französische Krieg, 1870–71 / redigirt von der Kriegsgeschichtlichen Abtheilung des Großen Generalstabes. Berlin 1878, p. 60
