= Vulaines-sur-Seine =

- Commune
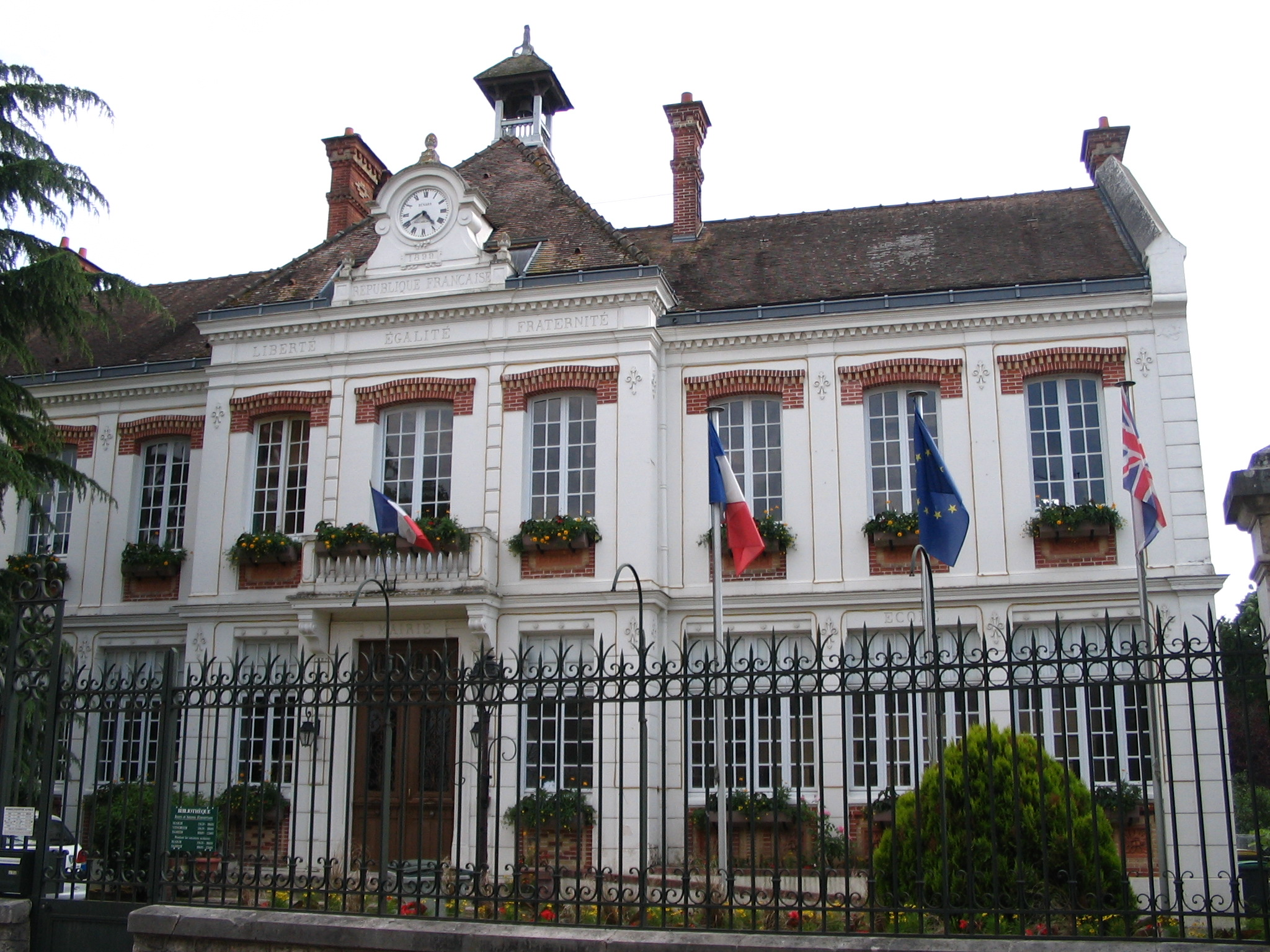
- The town hall in Vulaines-sur-Seine

- Coat of arms
- Location of Vulaines-sur-Seine
- Location within France Location within Île-de-France (region)
- Coordinates: 48°25′55″N 2°46′03″E
- Country: France
- Region: Île-de-France
- Department: Seine-et-Marne
- Arrondissement: Fontainebleau
- Canton: Fontainebleau
- Intercommunality: Pays de Fontainebleau

Government
  - Mayor (2020–2026): Patrick Chadaillat
- Area^{1}: 4.42 km^{2} (1.71 sq mi)
- Highest elevation: 104 m (341 ft)
- Lowest elevation: 42 m (138 ft)
- Population (2023): 2,730
  - Density: 618/km^{2} (1,600/sq mi)
- Demonym: Vulaignots
- Time zone: UTC+01:00 (CET)
  - Summer (DST): UTC+02:00 (CEST)
- INSEE/Postal code: 77533 /77870
- Website: www.vulaines-sur-seine.fr
- ^{1} French Land Register data, which excludes lakes, ponds, glaciers > 1 km^{2} (0.386 sq mi or 247 acres) and river estuaries.

Vulaines-sur-Seine (French pronunciation: [vylɛn syʁ sɛn]; lit. 'Vulaines-on-Seine') is a commune in the Seine-et-Marne department in the Île-de-France region in northern France.

The French symbolist poet Stéphane Mallarmé died there in September 1898.

== Twin towns ==
It is twinned with the village of Barby, Northamptonshire, United Kingdom.

== Population ==
Inhabitants of Vulaines-sur-Seine are called Vulaignots (masculine) and Vulaignottes (feminine) in French.

Historical population
Year	Pop.	±% p.a.
1968	903	—
1975	1,107	+2.95%
1982	1,685	+6.19%
1990	2,047	+2.46%
1999	2,065	+0.10%
2007	2,466	+2.24%
2012	2,645	+1.41%
2017	2,722	+0.58%
2023	2,730	+0.05%
Source: INSEE

== See also ==
- Communes of the Seine-et-Marne department
