= La Chapelle-la-Reine =

- Commune
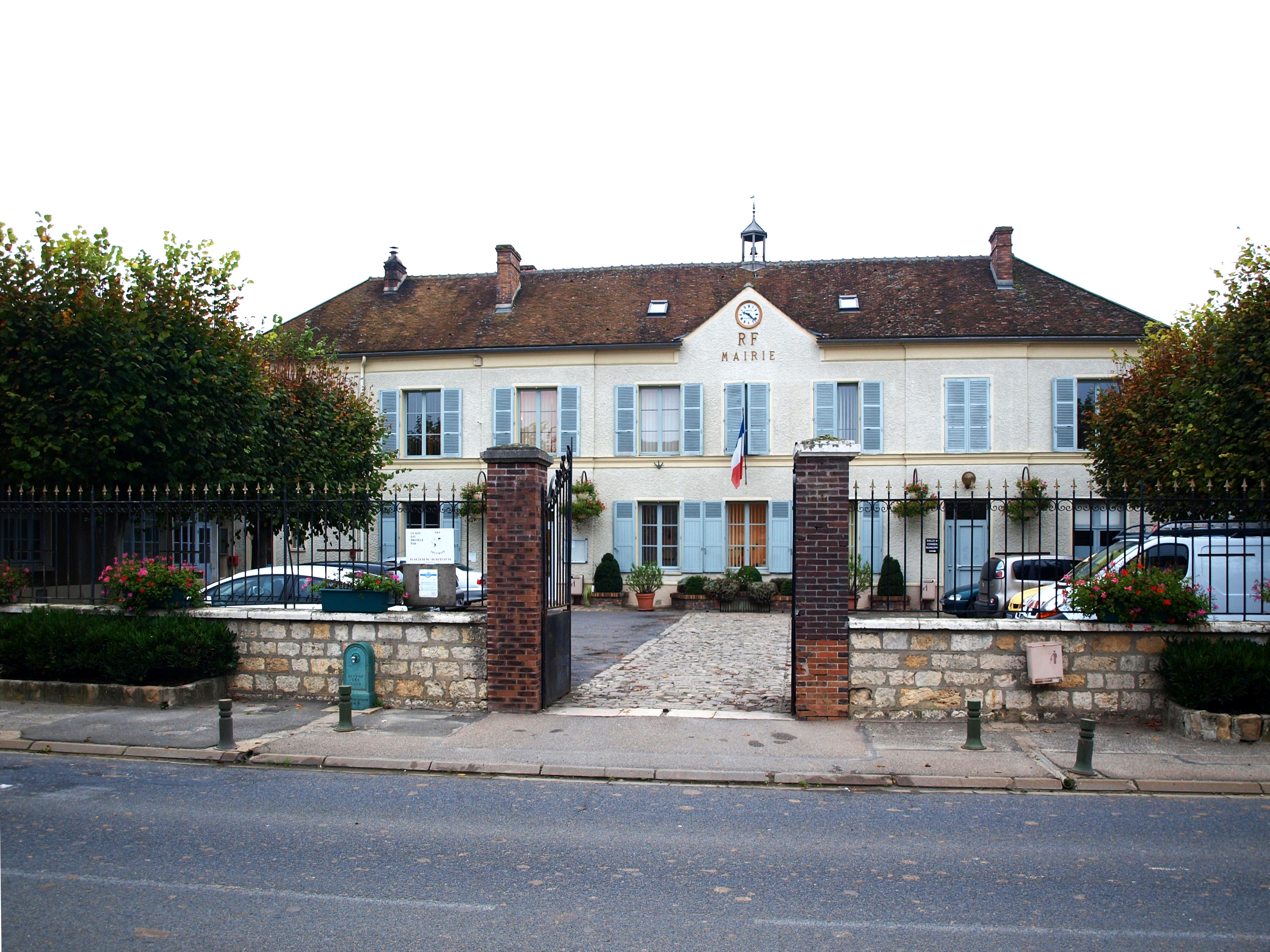
- The town hall in La Chapelle-la-Reine

- Coat of arms
- Location of La Chapelle-la-Reine
- Location within France Location within Île-de-France (region)
- Coordinates: 48°19′09″N 2°34′21″E
- Country: France
- Region: Île-de-France
- Department: Seine-et-Marne
- Arrondissement: Fontainebleau
- Canton: Fontainebleau
- Intercommunality: CA du Pays de Fontainebleau

Government
  - Mayor (2021–2026): Gérard Chanclud
- Area^{1}: 15.91 km^{2} (6.14 sq mi)
- Highest elevation: 140 m (460 ft)
- Lowest elevation: 109 m (358 ft)
- Population (2023): 2,170
  - Density: 136/km^{2} (353/sq mi)
- Demonym: Chapelains
- Time zone: UTC+01:00 (CET)
  - Summer (DST): UTC+02:00 (CEST)
- INSEE/Postal code: 77088 /77760
- Website: www.lachapellelareine.fr
- ^{1} French Land Register data, which excludes lakes, ponds, glaciers > 1 km^{2} (0.386 sq mi or 247 acres) and river estuaries.

La Chapelle-la-Reine (French pronunciation: [la ʃapɛl la ʁɛn]; lit. 'The Chapel-the-Queen') is a commune in the Seine-et-Marne department in the Île-de-France region in northern France.

== Population ==
The inhabitants are called Chapelains (masculine) and Chapelaines (feminine) in French.

Historical population
Year	Pop.	±% p.a.
1968	797	—
1975	1,100	+4.71%
1982	1,509	+4.62%
1990	2,125	+4.37%
1999	2,781	+3.03%
2007	2,659	−0.56%
2012	2,538	−0.93%
2017	2,418	−0.96%
2023	2,170	−1.79%
Source: INSEE

== See also ==
- Communes of the Seine-et-Marne department
