= Guercheville =

- Commune
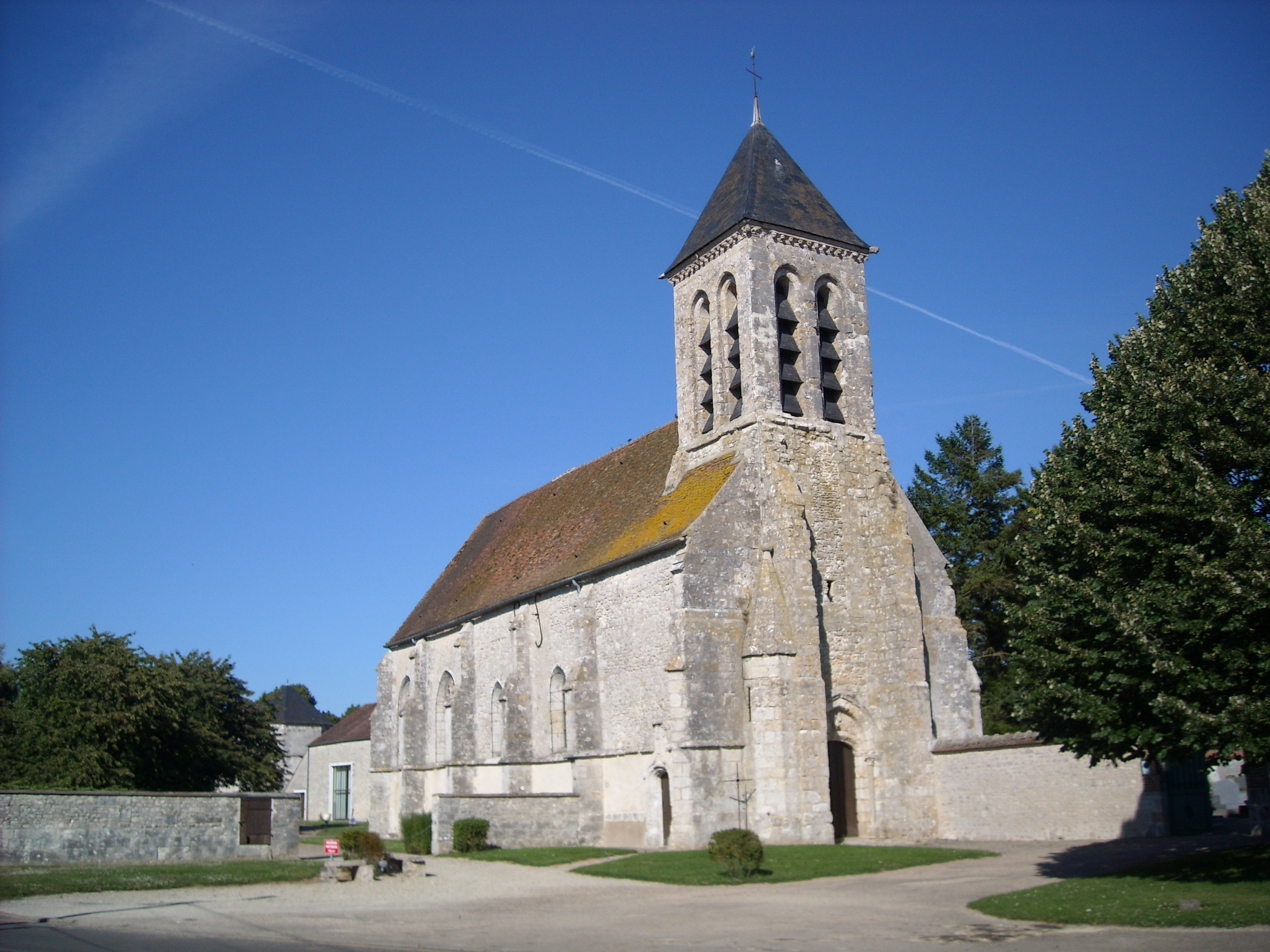
- The church in Guercheville
- Location of Guercheville
- Location within France Location within Île-de-France (region)
- Coordinates: 48°15′37″N 2°33′31″E
- Country: France
- Region: Île-de-France
- Department: Seine-et-Marne
- Arrondissement: Fontainebleau
- Canton: Fontainebleau

Government
  - Mayor (2025–2026): Jean-Luc Douine
- Area^{1}: 9.21 km^{2} (3.56 sq mi)
- Highest elevation: 122 m (400 ft)
- Lowest elevation: 109 m (358 ft)
- Population (2023): 268
  - Density: 29.1/km^{2} (75.4/sq mi)
- Time zone: UTC+01:00 (CET)
  - Summer (DST): UTC+02:00 (CEST)
- INSEE/Postal code: 77220 /77760
- ^{1} French Land Register data, which excludes lakes, ponds, glaciers > 1 km^{2} (0.386 sq mi or 247 acres) and river estuaries.

Guercheville (French pronunciation: [ɡɛʁʃəvil]) is a commune in the Seine-et-Marne department in the Île-de-France region in north-central France.

== Demographics ==
Inhabitants are called Guerchevillois.

== See also ==
- Communes of the Seine-et-Marne department
