= Burcy, Seine-et-Marne =

Burcy
- Commune
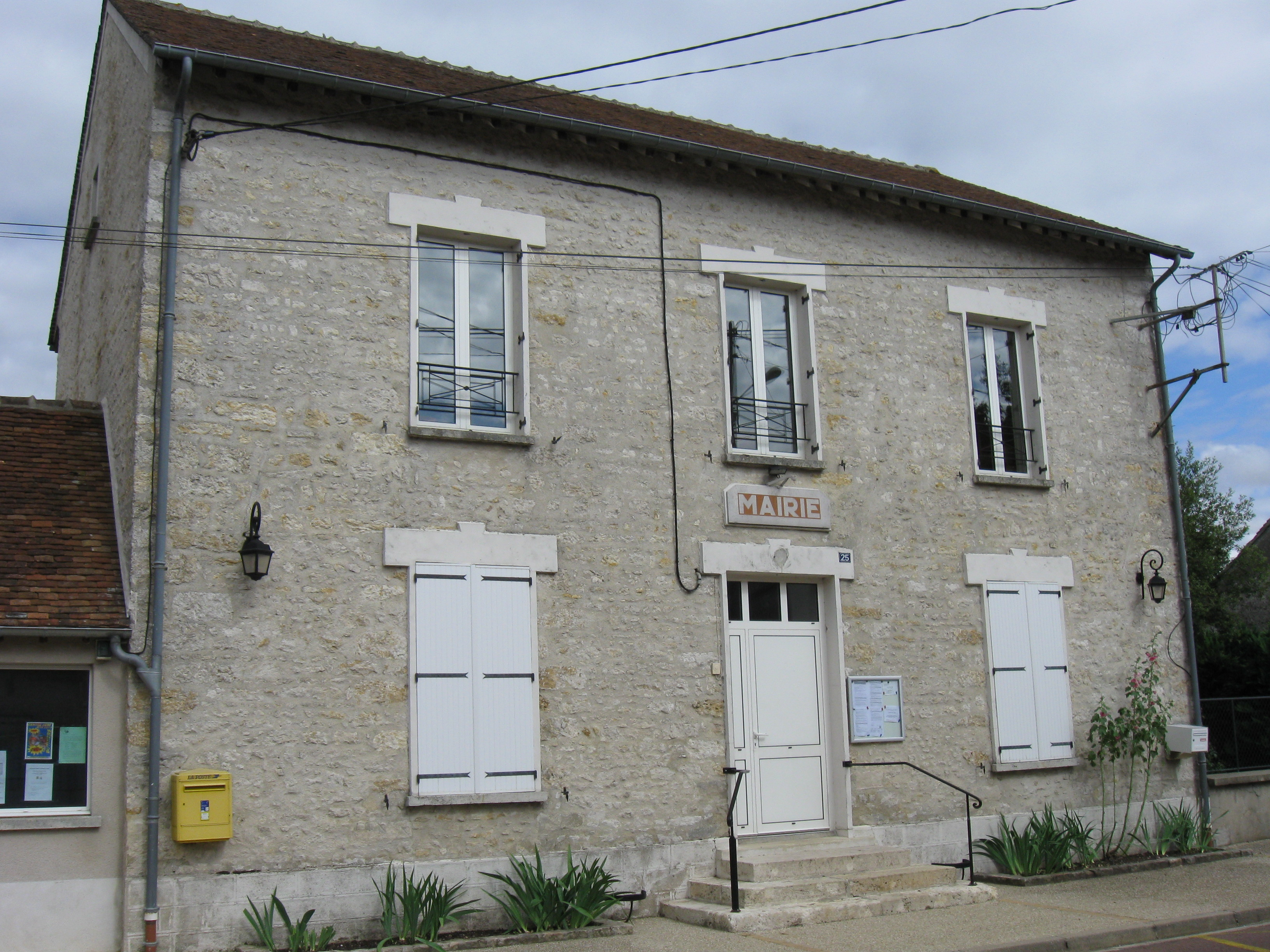
- The town hall in Burcy
- Location of Burcy
- Location within France Location within Île-de-France (region)
- Coordinates: 48°14′24″N 2°31′21″E
- Country: France
- Region: Île-de-France
- Department: Seine-et-Marne
- Arrondissement: Fontainebleau
- Canton: Fontainebleau

Government
  - Mayor (2020–2026): Philippe Chalmette
- Area^{1}: 7.03 km^{2} (2.71 sq mi)
- Highest elevation: 144 m (472 ft)
- Lowest elevation: 106 m (348 ft)
- Population (2023): 150
  - Density: 21/km^{2} (55/sq mi)
- Time zone: UTC+01:00 (CET)
  - Summer (DST): UTC+02:00 (CEST)
- INSEE/Postal code: 77056 /77890
- ^{1} French Land Register data, which excludes lakes, ponds, glaciers > 1 km^{2} (0.386 sq mi or 247 acres) and river estuaries.

Burcy (French pronunciation: [byʁsi]) is a commune in the Seine-et-Marne department in the Île-de-France region.

== See also ==
- Communes of the Seine-et-Marne department
