= Nanteau-sur-Essonne =

- Commune
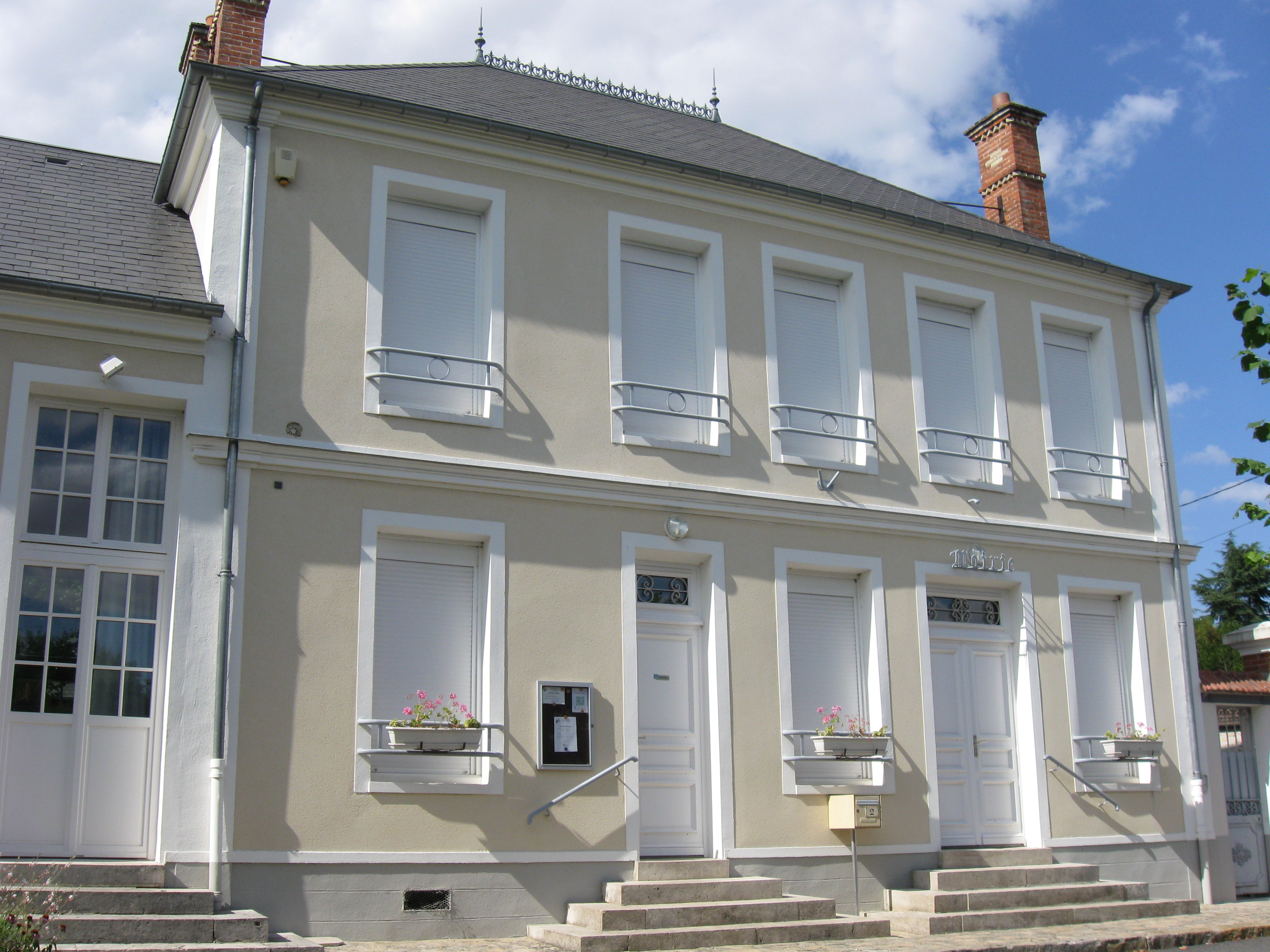
- The town hall in Nanteau-sur-Essonne
- Location of Nanteau-sur-Essonne
- Location within France Location within Île-de-France (region)
- Coordinates: 48°19′01″N 2°25′05″E
- Country: France
- Region: Île-de-France
- Department: Seine-et-Marne
- Arrondissement: Fontainebleau
- Canton: Fontainebleau

Government
  - Mayor (2020–2026): Olivier Mauxion
- Area^{1}: 12.92 km^{2} (4.99 sq mi)
- Highest elevation: 127 m (417 ft)
- Lowest elevation: 67 m (220 ft)
- Population (2023): 414
  - Density: 32.0/km^{2} (83.0/sq mi)
- Time zone: UTC+01:00 (CET)
  - Summer (DST): UTC+02:00 (CEST)
- INSEE/Postal code: 77328 /77760
- ^{1} French Land Register data, which excludes lakes, ponds, glaciers > 1 km^{2} (0.386 sq mi or 247 acres) and river estuaries.

Nanteau-sur-Essonne (French pronunciation: [nɑ̃to syʁ ɛsɔn], literally Nanteau on Essonne) is a commune in the Seine-et-Marne department in the Île-de-France region in north-central France.

== Demographics ==
Inhabitants are called Nantessonnais.

== Services ==
The commune has a boat rental service.

== See also ==
- Communes of the Seine-et-Marne department
