= Tousson =

- Commune
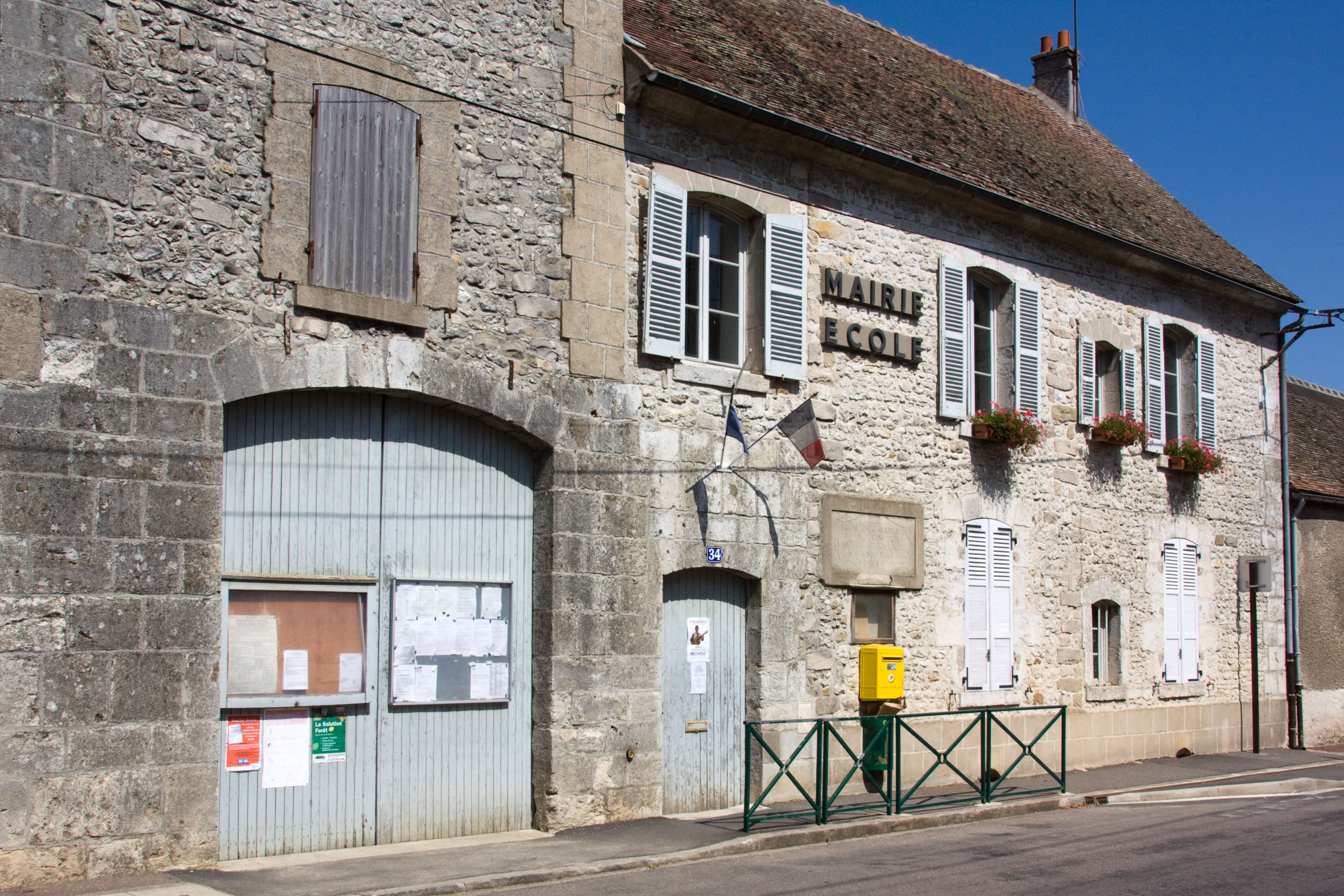
- The town hall in Tousson
- Location of Tousson
- Location within France Location within Île-de-France (region)
- Coordinates: 48°20′52″N 2°27′33″E
- Country: France
- Region: Île-de-France
- Department: Seine-et-Marne
- Arrondissement: Fontainebleau
- Canton: Fontainebleau
- Intercommunality: CA Pays de Fontainebleau

Government
  - Mayor (2020–2026): Michaël Goué
- Area^{1}: 13.24 km^{2} (5.11 sq mi)
- Highest elevation: 133 m (436 ft)
- Lowest elevation: 104 m (341 ft)
- Population (2023): 334
  - Density: 25.2/km^{2} (65.3/sq mi)
- Time zone: UTC+01:00 (CET)
  - Summer (DST): UTC+02:00 (CEST)
- INSEE/Postal code: 77471 /77123
- ^{1} French Land Register data, which excludes lakes, ponds, glaciers > 1 km^{2} (0.386 sq mi or 247 acres) and river estuaries.

Tousson (French pronunciation: [tusɔ̃]) is a commune in the Seine-et-Marne department in the Île-de-France region in north-central France.

== Demographics ==
Inhabitants of Tousson are called Toussonnais.

== See also ==
- Communes of the Seine-et-Marne department
