= Fromont =

- Commune
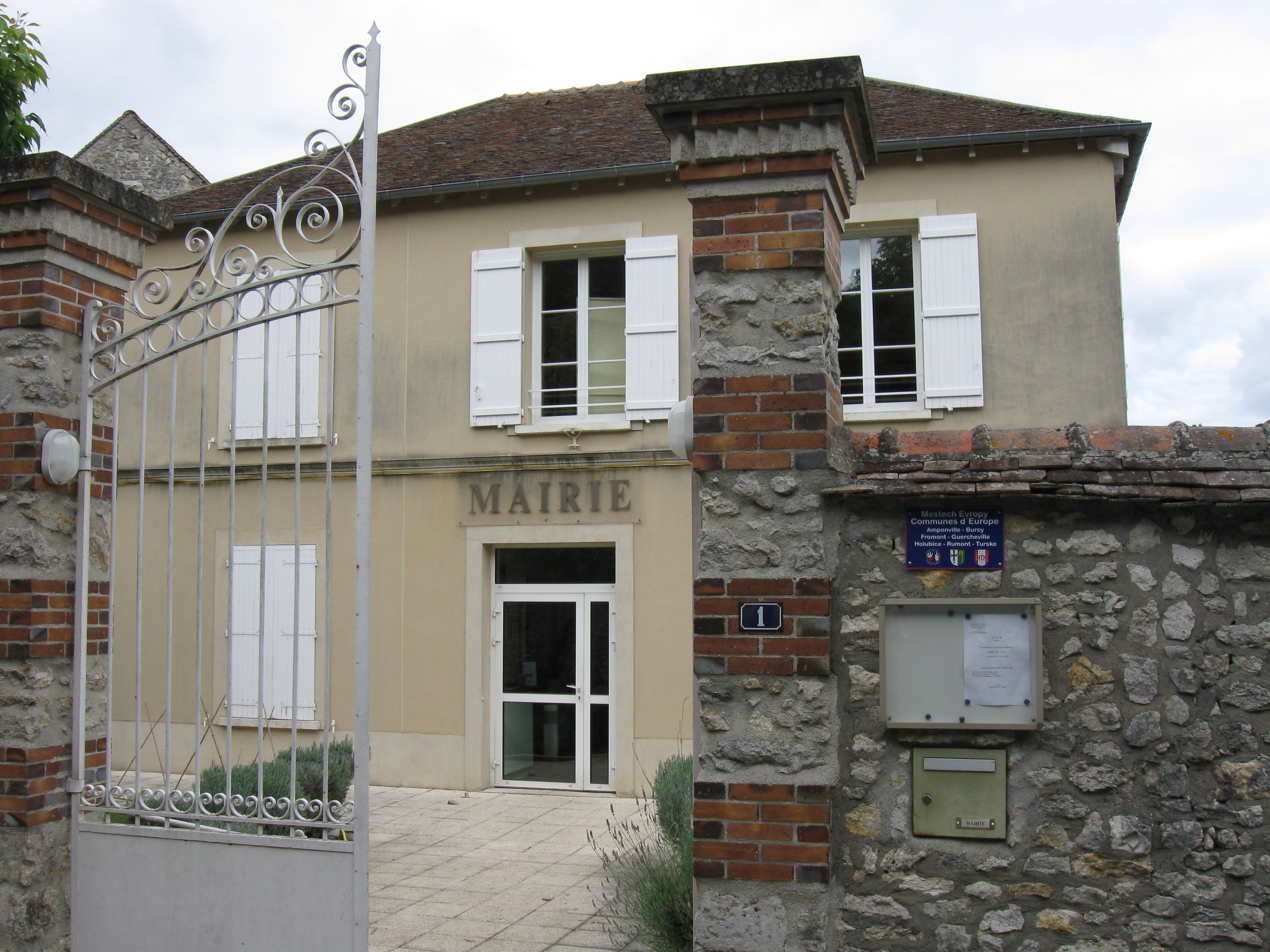
- The town hall in Fromont
- Location of Fromont
- Location within France Location within Île-de-France (region)
- Coordinates: 48°15′22″N 2°30′17″E
- Country: France
- Region: Île-de-France
- Department: Seine-et-Marne
- Arrondissement: Fontainebleau
- Canton: Fontainebleau

Government
  - Mayor (2020–2026): François Roisneau
- Area^{1}: 10.72 km^{2} (4.14 sq mi)
- Highest elevation: 142 m (466 ft)
- Lowest elevation: 107 m (351 ft)
- Population (2023): 230
  - Density: 21/km^{2} (56/sq mi)
- Time zone: UTC+01:00 (CET)
  - Summer (DST): UTC+02:00 (CEST)
- INSEE/Postal code: 77198 /77760
- ^{1} French Land Register data, which excludes lakes, ponds, glaciers > 1 km^{2} (0.386 sq mi or 247 acres) and river estuaries.

Fromont (French pronunciation: [fʁɔmɔ̃]) is a commune in the Seine-et-Marne department in the Île-de-France region in north-central France. Demonym: Fromontais.

== See also ==
- Communes of the Seine-et-Marne department
