= Amponville =

- Commune
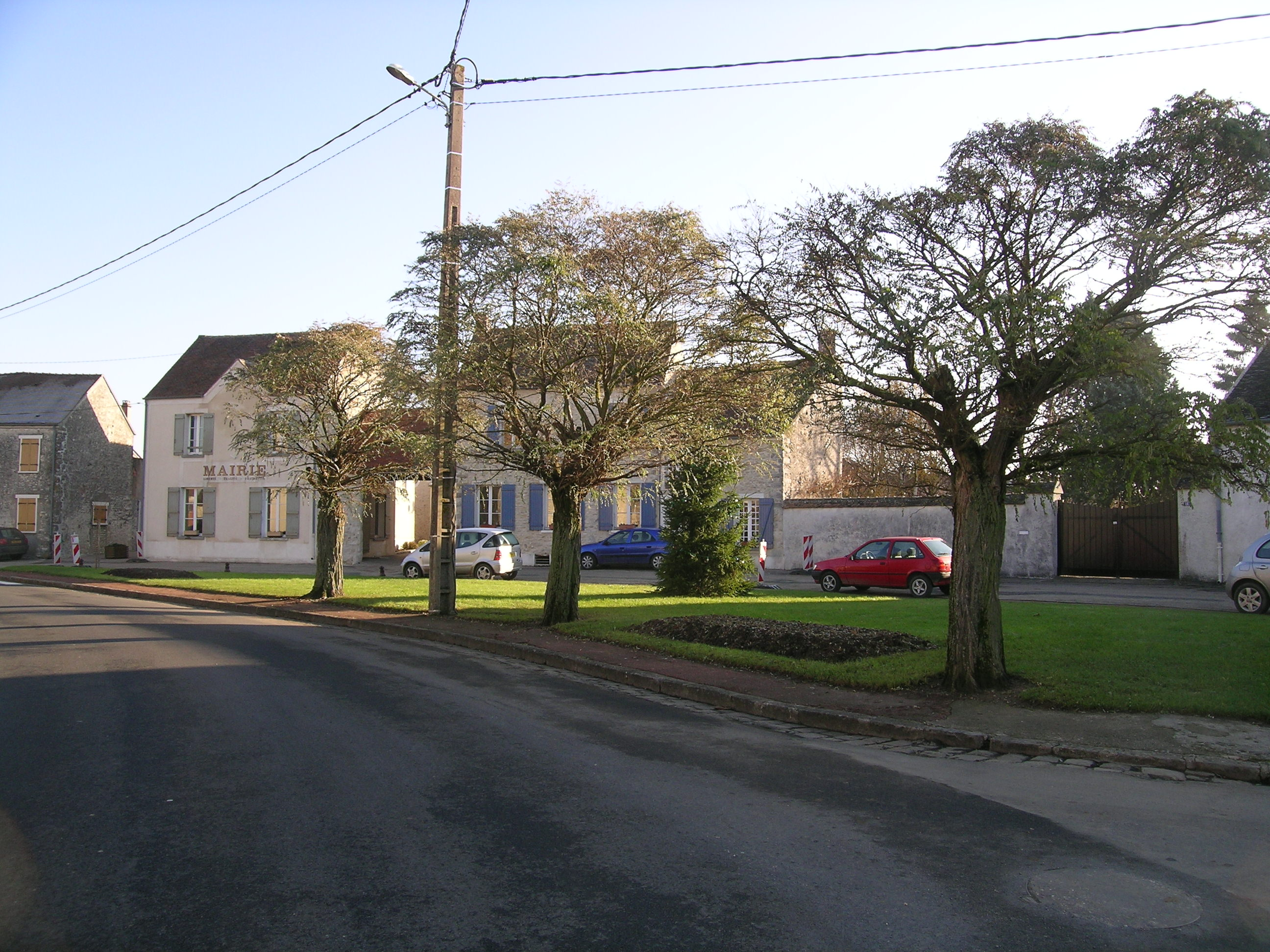
- The town hall and surroundings in Amponville
- Location of Amponville
- Location within France Location within Île-de-France (region)
- Coordinates: 48°16′47″N 2°31′50″E
- Country: France
- Region: Île-de-France
- Department: Seine-et-Marne
- Arrondissement: Fontainebleau
- Canton: Fontainebleau
- Intercommunality: Pays de Nemours

Government
  - Mayor (2020–2026): François-Xavier Dupérat
- Area^{1}: 12.3 km^{2} (4.7 sq mi)
- Highest elevation: 122 m (400 ft)
- Lowest elevation: 103 m (338 ft)
- Population (2023): 349
  - Density: 28.4/km^{2} (73.5/sq mi)
- Time zone: UTC+01:00 (CET)
  - Summer (DST): UTC+02:00 (CEST)
- INSEE/Postal code: 77003 /77760
- ^{1} French Land Register data, which excludes lakes, ponds, glaciers > 1 km^{2} (0.386 sq mi or 247 acres) and river estuaries.

Amponville (French pronunciation: [ɑ̃pɔ̃vil]) is a commune in the Seine-et-Marne department in the Île-de-France region in north-central France.

== Demographics ==
The inhabitants are called Amponvillois.

== See also ==
- Communes of the Seine-et-Marne department
