= Recloses =

- Commune
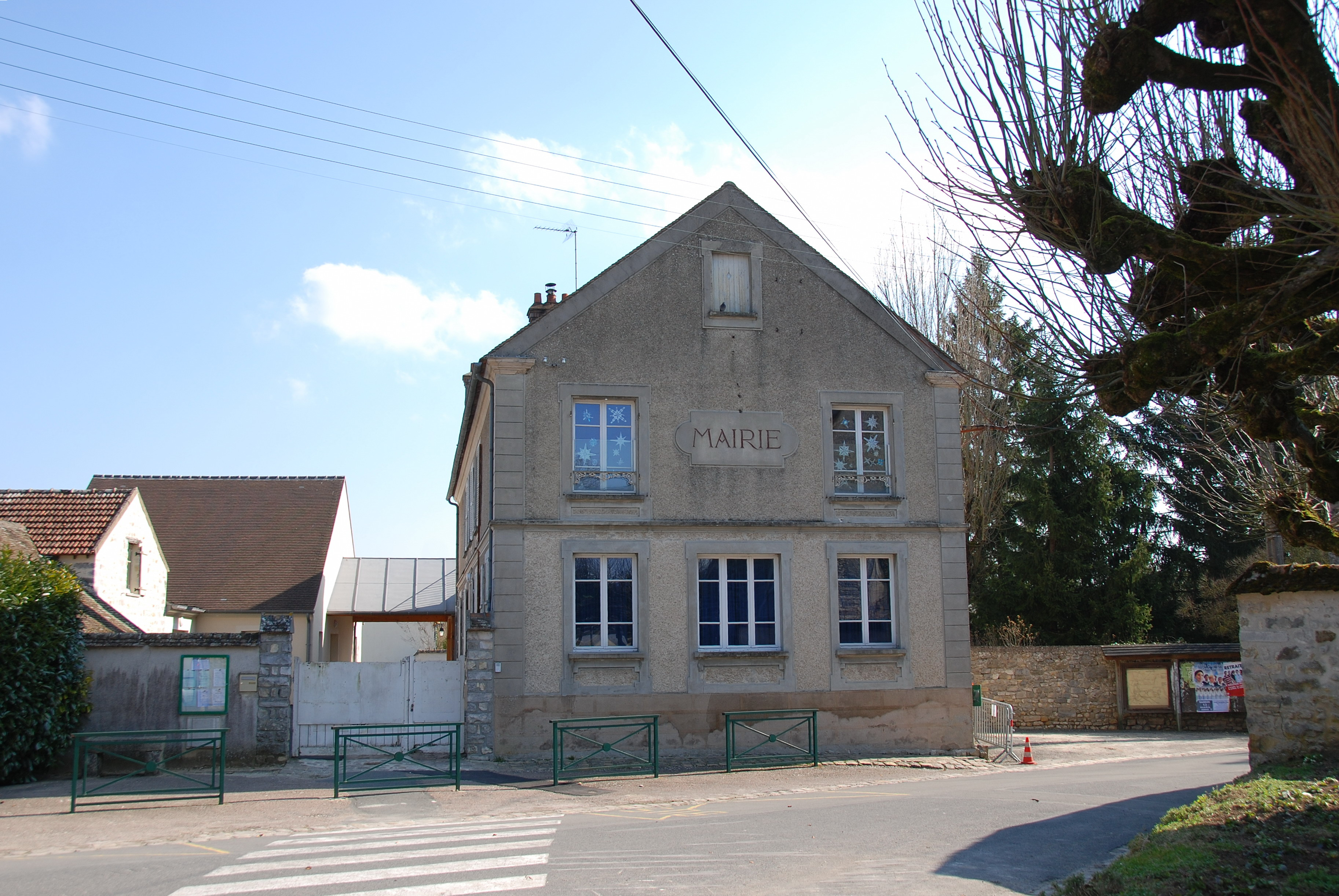
- Former town hall in Recloses, now elementary school

- Coat of arms
- Location of Recloses
- Location within France Location within Île-de-France (region)
- Coordinates: 48°20′55″N 2°38′33″E
- Country: France
- Region: Île-de-France
- Department: Seine-et-Marne
- Arrondissement: Fontainebleau
- Canton: Fontainebleau
- Intercommunality: CA Pays de Fontainebleau

Government
  - Mayor (2020–2026): Sonia Risco
- Area^{1}: 9.35 km^{2} (3.61 sq mi)
- Highest elevation: 133 m (436 ft)
- Lowest elevation: 72 m (236 ft)
- Population (2023): 633
  - Density: 67.7/km^{2} (175/sq mi)
- Time zone: UTC+01:00 (CET)
  - Summer (DST): UTC+02:00 (CEST)
- INSEE/Postal code: 77386 /77760
- Website: recloses.fr
- ^{1} French Land Register data, which excludes lakes, ponds, glaciers > 1 km^{2} (0.386 sq mi or 247 acres) and river estuaries.

Recloses (French pronunciation: [ʁəkloz]) is a commune in the Seine-et-Marne department in the Île-de-France region in north-central France.

== Demographics ==
The inhabitants are called Reclosiots in French.

Historical population
Year	Pop.	±% p.a.
1968	474	—
1975	410	−2.05%
1982	507	+3.08%
1990	519	+0.29%
1999	600	+1.62%
2007	687	+1.71%
2012	699	+0.35%
2017	635	−1.90%
2023	633	−0.05%
Source: INSEE

== See also ==
- Communes of the Seine-et-Marne department
