= Achères-la-Forêt =

- Commune
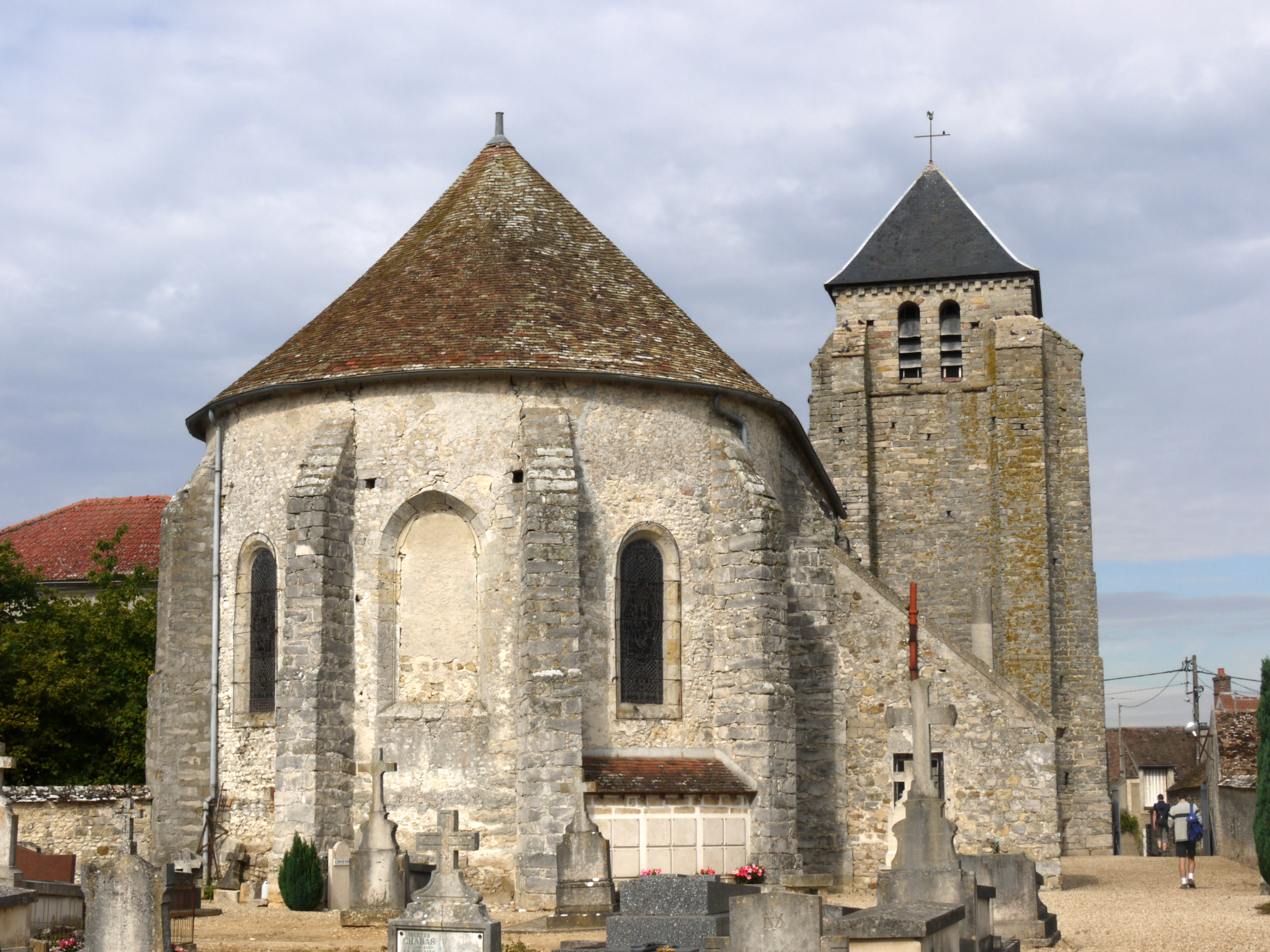
- The church in Achères-la-Forêt
- Location of Achères-la-Forêt
- Location within France Location within Île-de-France (region)
- Coordinates: 48°20′46″N 2°33′57″E
- Country: France
- Region: Île-de-France
- Department: Seine-et-Marne
- Arrondissement: Fontainebleau
- Canton: Fontainebleau
- Intercommunality: CA du Pays de Fontainebleau

Government
  - Mayor (2023–2026): Vanessa Piel
- Area^{1}: 12.6 km^{2} (4.9 sq mi)
- Highest elevation: 126 m (413 ft)
- Lowest elevation: 73 m (240 ft)
- Population (2023): 1,191
  - Density: 94.5/km^{2} (245/sq mi)
- Demonym: Achèrois
- Time zone: UTC+01:00 (CET)
  - Summer (DST): UTC+02:00 (CEST)
- INSEE/Postal code: 77001 /77760
- Website: www.achereslaforet.com
- ^{1} French Land Register data, which excludes lakes, ponds, glaciers > 1 km^{2} (0.386 sq mi or 247 acres) and river estuaries.

Achères-la-Forêt (French pronunciation: [aʃɛʁ la fɔʁɛ]; lit. 'Achères-the-Forest') is a commune in the Seine-et-Marne department in the Île-de-France region in northern France.

== Population ==
The inhabitants are called Achérois in French.

Historical population
Year	Pop.	±% p.a.
1968	459	—
1975	647	+5.03%
1982	754	+2.21%
1990	903	+2.28%
1999	1,040	+1.58%
2007	1,242	+2.24%
2012	1,224	−0.29%
2017	1,125	−1.67%
2023	1,191	+0.95%
Source: INSEE

== Places of interest ==
- Sainte-Fare church (12th to 15th centuries, Romanesque architecture), historical monument

== See also ==
- Communes of the Seine-et-Marne department
