= Héricy =

- Commune
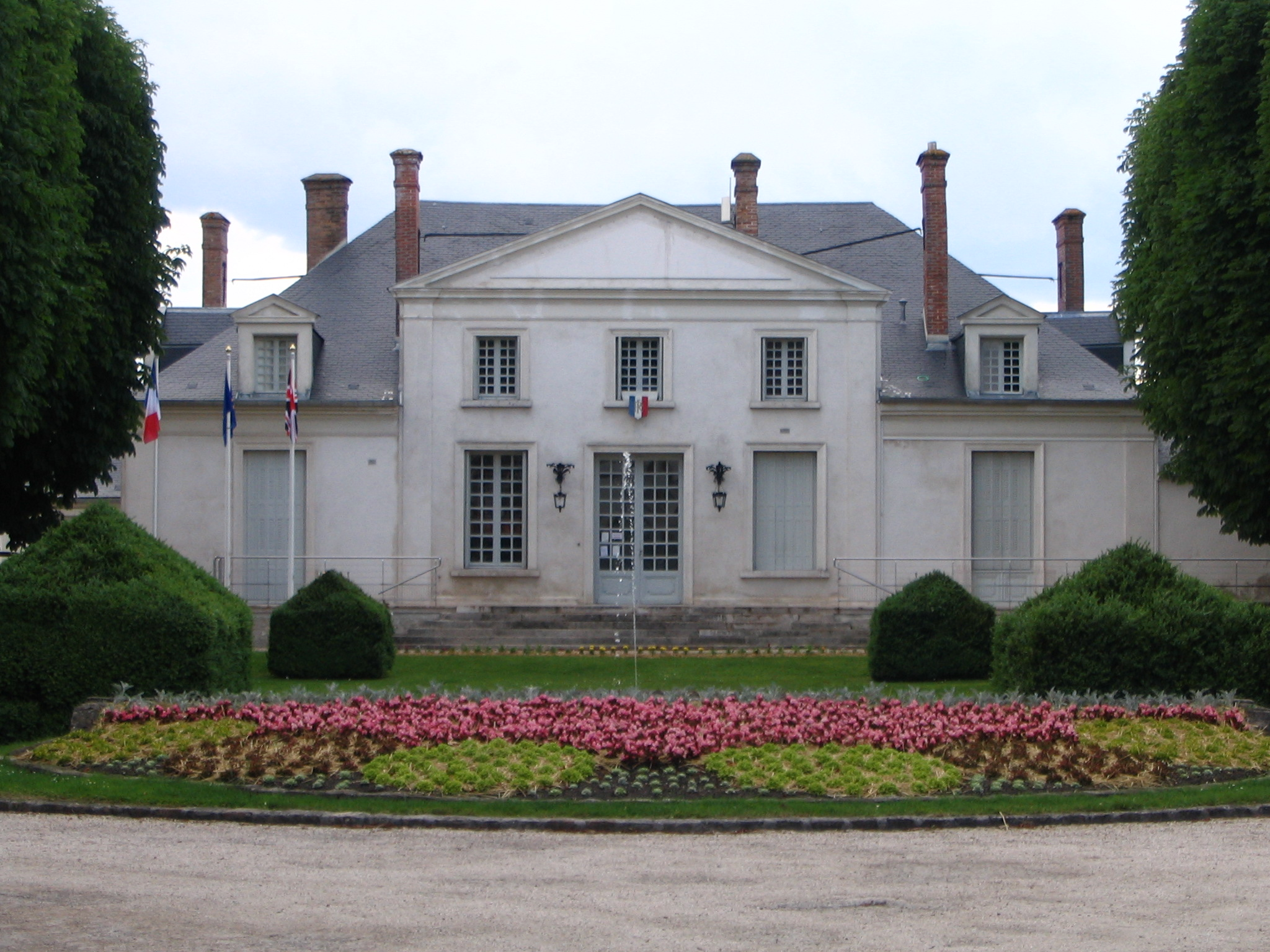
- The town hall in Héricy

- Coat of arms
- Location of Héricy
- Location within France Location within Île-de-France (region)
- Coordinates: 48°26′50″N 2°45′50″E
- Country: France
- Region: Île-de-France
- Department: Seine-et-Marne
- Arrondissement: Fontainebleau
- Canton: Fontainebleau
- Intercommunality: CA Pays de Fontainebleau

Government
  - Mayor (2020–2026): Yannick Torres
- Area^{1}: 10.68 km^{2} (4.12 sq mi)
- Highest elevation: 103 m (338 ft)
- Lowest elevation: 42 m (138 ft)
- Population (2023): 2,507
  - Density: 234.7/km^{2} (608.0/sq mi)
- Time zone: UTC+01:00 (CET)
  - Summer (DST): UTC+02:00 (CEST)
- INSEE/Postal code: 77226 /77850
- ^{1} French Land Register data, which excludes lakes, ponds, glaciers > 1 km^{2} (0.386 sq mi or 247 acres) and river estuaries.

Héricy (French: [eʁisi]) is a commune in the Seine-et-Marne department in the Île-de-France region in north-central France.

== Population ==
Historical population
Year	Pop.	±% p.a.
1968	1,293	—
1975	1,478	+1.93%
1982	1,861	+3.35%
1990	2,216	+2.21%
1999	2,519	+1.43%
2007	2,585	+0.32%
2012	2,504	−0.63%
2017	2,604	+0.79%
2023	2,507	−0.63%
Source: INSEE

Inhabitants are called Héricéens in French.

== See also ==
- Communes of the Seine-et-Marne department
