= Perthes, Seine-et-Marne =

Perthes
- Commune
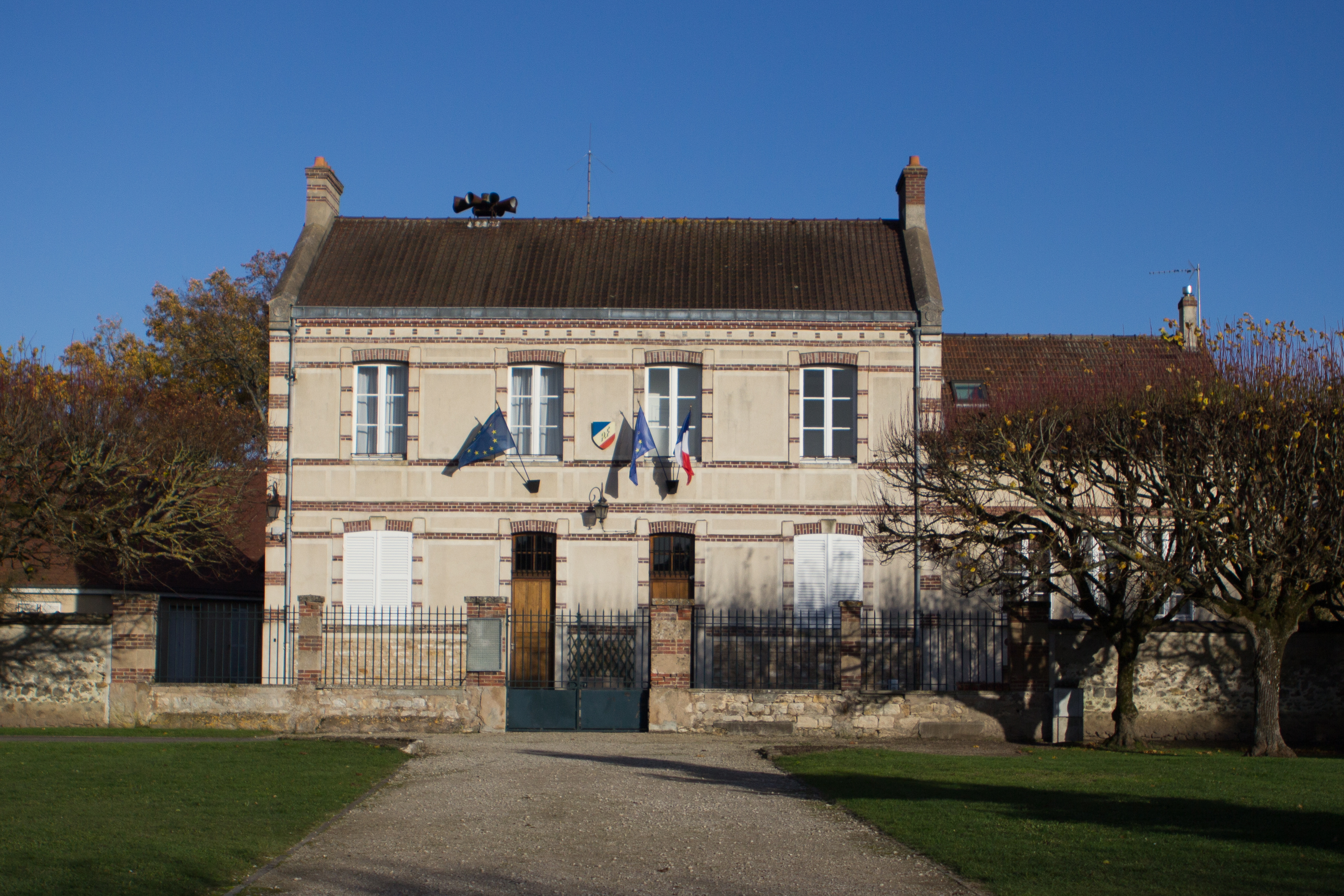
- The town hall in Perthes

- Coat of arms
- Location of Perthes
- Location within France Location within Île-de-France (region)
- Coordinates: 48°28′40″N 2°33′13″E
- Country: France
- Region: Île-de-France
- Department: Seine-et-Marne
- Arrondissement: Fontainebleau
- Canton: Fontainebleau
- Intercommunality: CA Pays de Fontainebleau

Government
  - Mayor (2020–2026): Fabrice Larché
- Area^{1}: 12.22 km^{2} (4.72 sq mi)
- Highest elevation: 84 m (276 ft)
- Lowest elevation: 45 m (148 ft)
- Population (2023): 2,073
  - Density: 169.6/km^{2} (439.4/sq mi)
- Time zone: UTC+01:00 (CET)
  - Summer (DST): UTC+02:00 (CEST)
- INSEE/Postal code: 77359 /77930
- ^{1} French Land Register data, which excludes lakes, ponds, glaciers > 1 km^{2} (0.386 sq mi or 247 acres) and river estuaries.

Perthes (French pronunciation: [pɛʁt]) is a commune in the Seine-et-Marne department in the Île-de-France region in north-central France.

== Population ==
Historical population
Year	Pop.	±% p.a.
1968	937	—
1975	1,297	+4.75%
1982	1,537	+2.46%
1990	1,707	+1.32%
1999	1,896	+1.17%
2007	2,088	+1.21%
2012	2,134	+0.44%
2017	1,995	−1.34%
2023	2,073	+0.64%
Source: INSEE

Inhabitants are called Perthois in French.

== See also ==
- Communes of the Seine-et-Marne department
