= Saint-Germain-sur-École =

Saint-Germain
- Commune
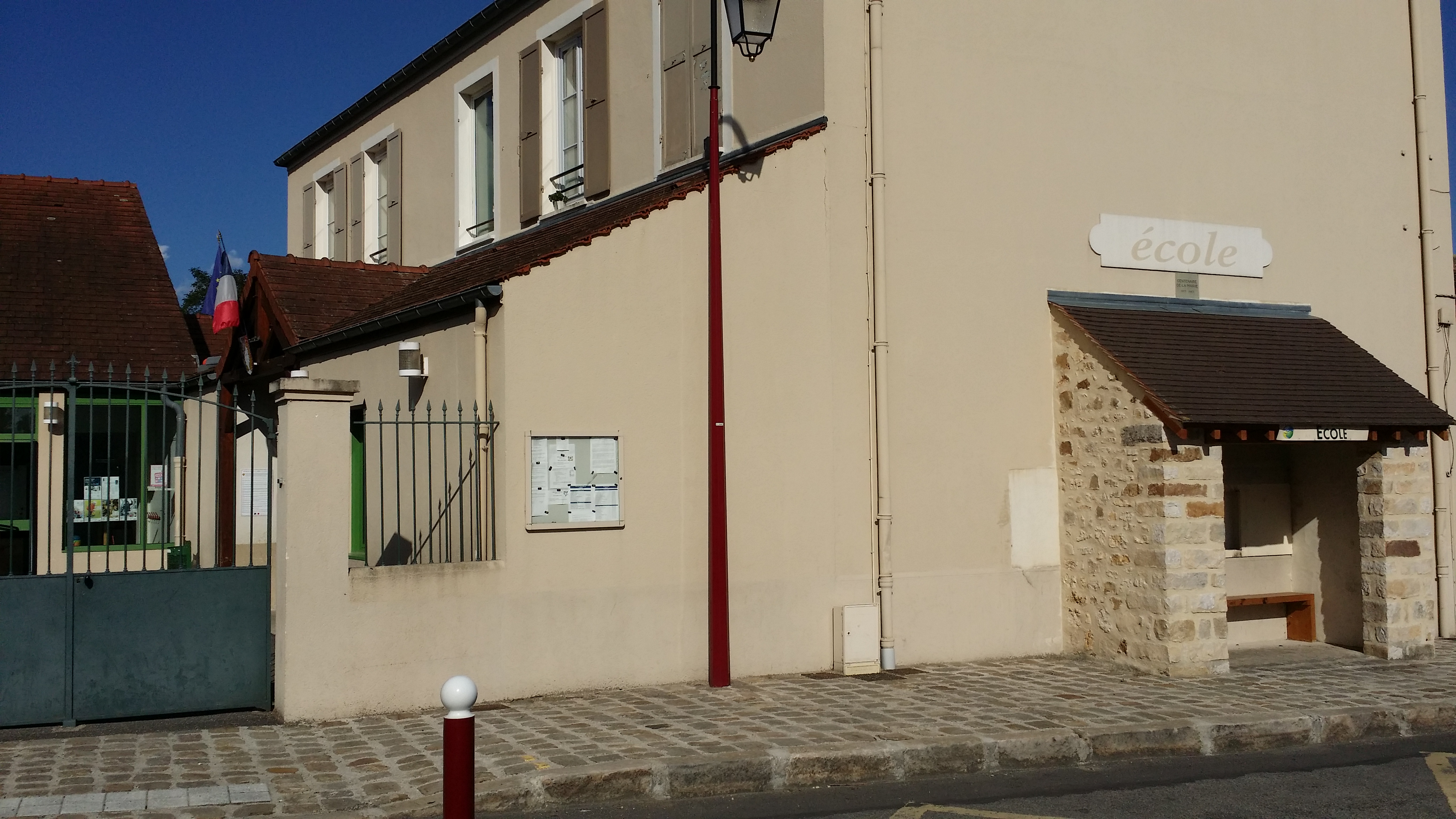
- The school in Saint-Germain-sur-École
- Location of Saint-Germain
- Location within France Location within Île-de-France (region)
- Coordinates: 48°28′28″N 2°30′37″E
- Country: France
- Region: Île-de-France
- Department: Seine-et-Marne
- Arrondissement: Fontainebleau
- Canton: Fontainebleau
- Intercommunality: CA Pays de Fontainebleau

Government
  - Mayor (2023–2026): Jean Helie
- Area^{1}: 2.53 km^{2} (0.98 sq mi)
- Highest elevation: 80 m (260 ft)
- Lowest elevation: 45 m (148 ft)
- Population (2023): 365
  - Density: 144/km^{2} (374/sq mi)
- Time zone: UTC+01:00 (CET)
  - Summer (DST): UTC+02:00 (CEST)
- INSEE/Postal code: 77412 /77930
- ^{1} French Land Register data, which excludes lakes, ponds, glaciers > 1 km^{2} (0.386 sq mi or 247 acres) and river estuaries.

Saint-Germain-sur-École (French pronunciation: [sɛ̃ ʒɛʁmɛ̃ syʁ ekɔl]) is a commune in the Seine-et-Marne department in the Île-de-France region in north-central France.

== Population ==
Historical population
Year	Pop.	±% p.a.
1968	164	—
1975	187	+1.89%
1982	244	+3.87%
1990	329	+3.81%
1999	328	−0.03%
2007	355	+0.99%
2012	347	−0.45%
2017	366	+1.07%
2023	365	−0.05%
Source: INSEE

== Demographics ==
Inhabitants of Saint-Germain-sur-École are called Saint-Germanois.

== See also ==
- Communes of the Seine-et-Marne department
