= Saint-Martin-en-Bière =

- Commune
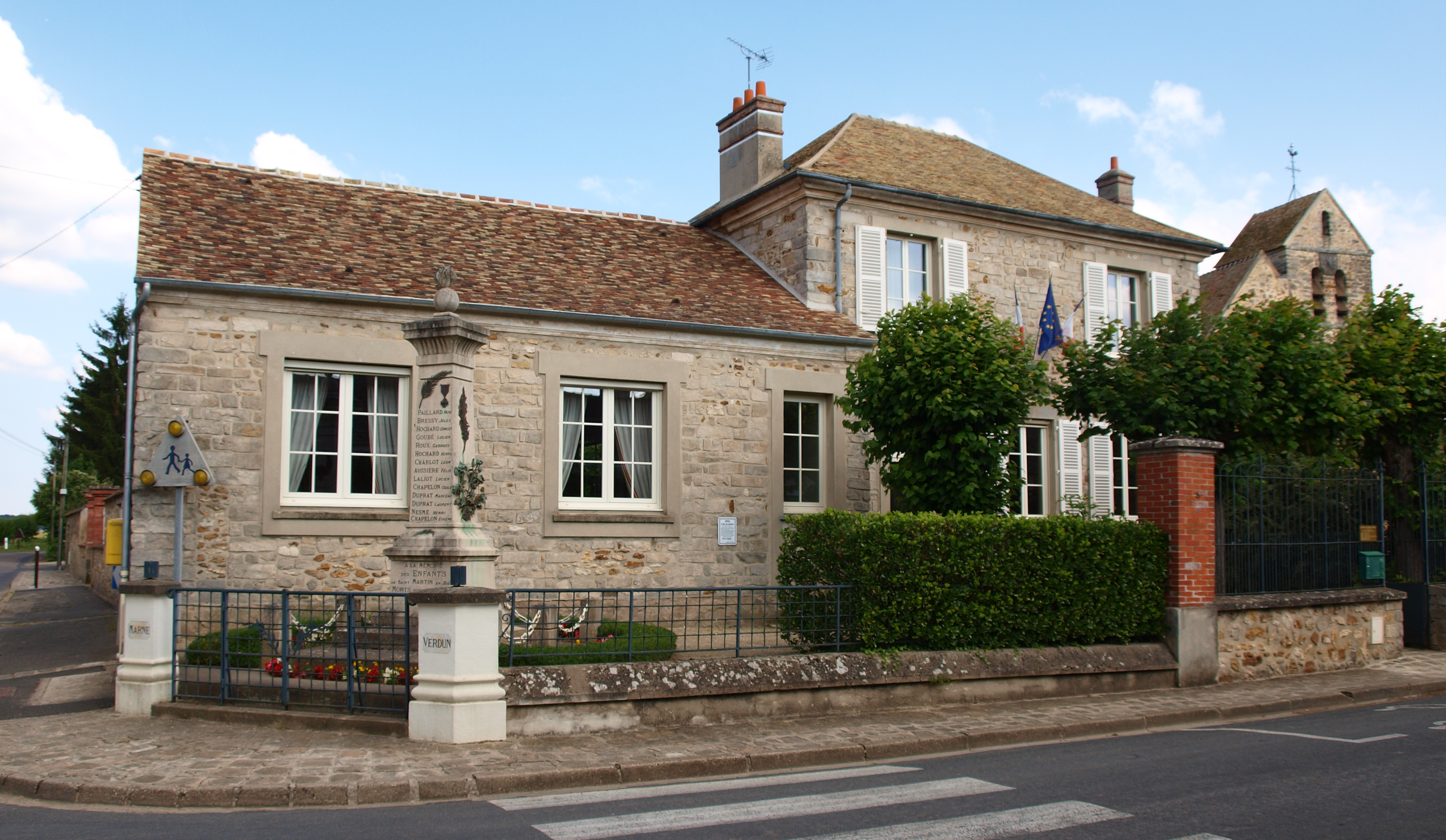
- The town hall in Saint-Martin-en-Bière
- Location of Saint-Martin-en-Bière
- Location within France Location within Île-de-France (region)
- Coordinates: 48°26′17″N 2°34′05″E
- Country: France
- Region: Île-de-France
- Department: Seine-et-Marne
- Arrondissement: Fontainebleau
- Canton: Fontainebleau
- Intercommunality: CA Pays de Fontainebleau

Government
  - Mayor (2020–2026): Véronique Femenia
- Area^{1}: 7.81 km^{2} (3.02 sq mi)
- Highest elevation: 90 m (300 ft)
- Lowest elevation: 64 m (210 ft)
- Population (2023): 746
  - Density: 95.5/km^{2} (247/sq mi)
- Time zone: UTC+01:00 (CET)
  - Summer (DST): UTC+02:00 (CEST)
- INSEE/Postal code: 77425 /77630
- ^{1} French Land Register data, which excludes lakes, ponds, glaciers > 1 km^{2} (0.386 sq mi or 247 acres) and river estuaries.

Saint-Martin-en-Bière (French pronunciation: [sɛ̃ maʁtɛ̃ ɑ̃ bjɛʁ], lit. 'Saint-Martin in Bière') is a commune in the Seine-et-Marne department in the Île-de-France region in north-central France.

== Demographics ==
Inhabitants of Saint-Martin-en-Bière are called San-Martinois.

== See also ==
- Communes of the Seine-et-Marne department
