= Cély =

- Commune
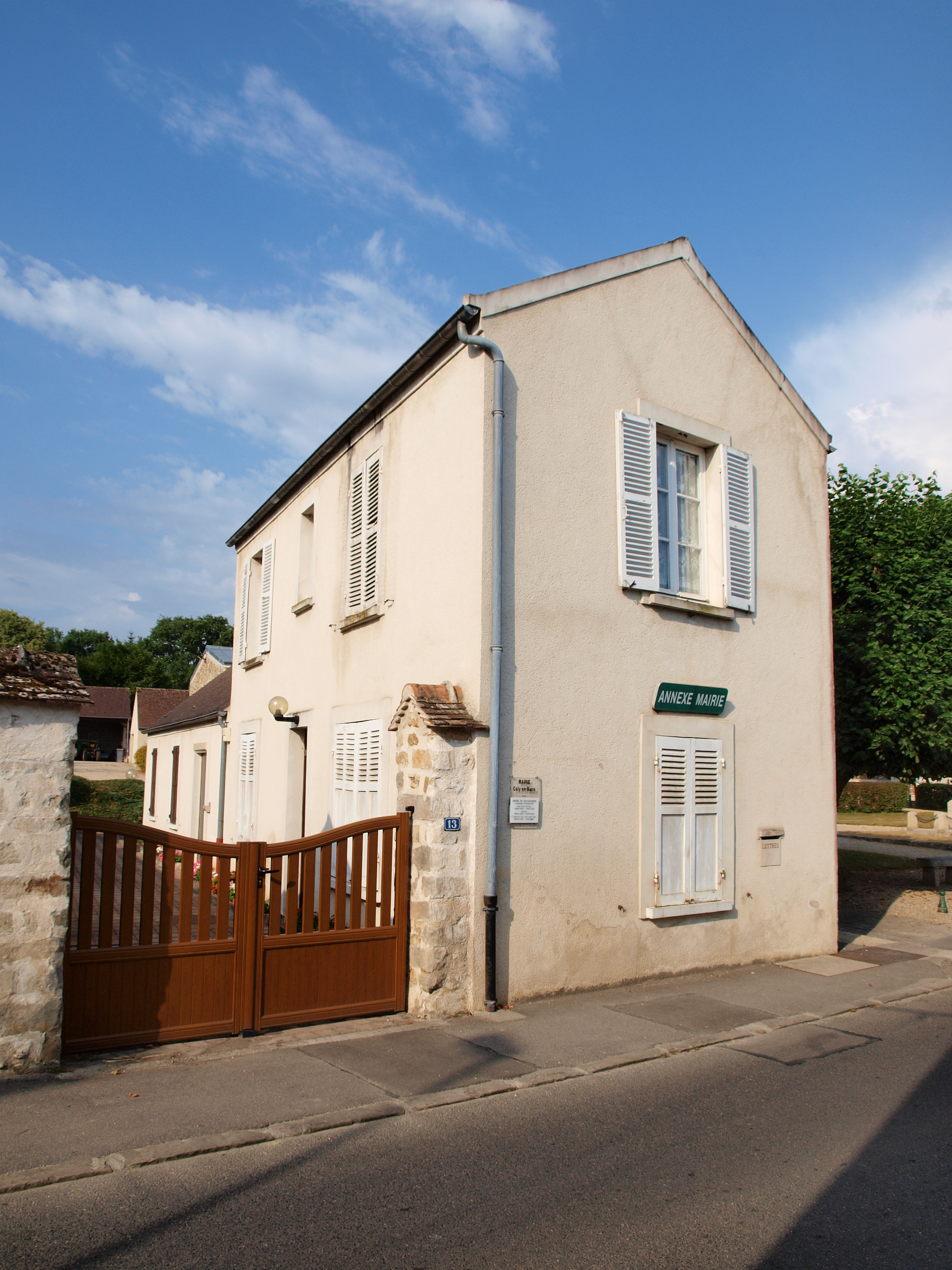
- Location of Cély
- Location within France Location within Île-de-France (region)
- Coordinates: 48°27′36″N 2°31′57″E
- Country: France
- Region: Île-de-France
- Department: Seine-et-Marne
- Arrondissement: Fontainebleau
- Canton: Fontainebleau
- Intercommunality: CA Pays de Fontainebleau

Government
  - Mayor (2020–2026): Francis Guerrier
- Area^{1}: 0.62 km^{2} (0.24 sq mi)
- Highest elevation: 96 m (315 ft)
- Lowest elevation: 48 m (157 ft)
- Population (2023): 1,259
  - Density: 2,000/km^{2} (5,300/sq mi)
- Time zone: UTC+01:00 (CET)
  - Summer (DST): UTC+02:00 (CEST)
- INSEE/Postal code: 77065 /77930
- ^{1} French Land Register data, which excludes lakes, ponds, glaciers > 1 km^{2} (0.386 sq mi or 247 acres) and river estuaries.

Cély (French pronunciation: [seli]), also known as Cély-en-Bière ([seli ɑ̃ bjɛʁ], lit. 'Cély in Bière'), is a commune in the Seine-et-Marne department in the Île-de-France region in north-central France.

== Demographics ==
The inhabitants are called Célysiens.

== See also ==
- Communes of the Seine-et-Marne department
