= Fleury-en-Bière =

- Commune
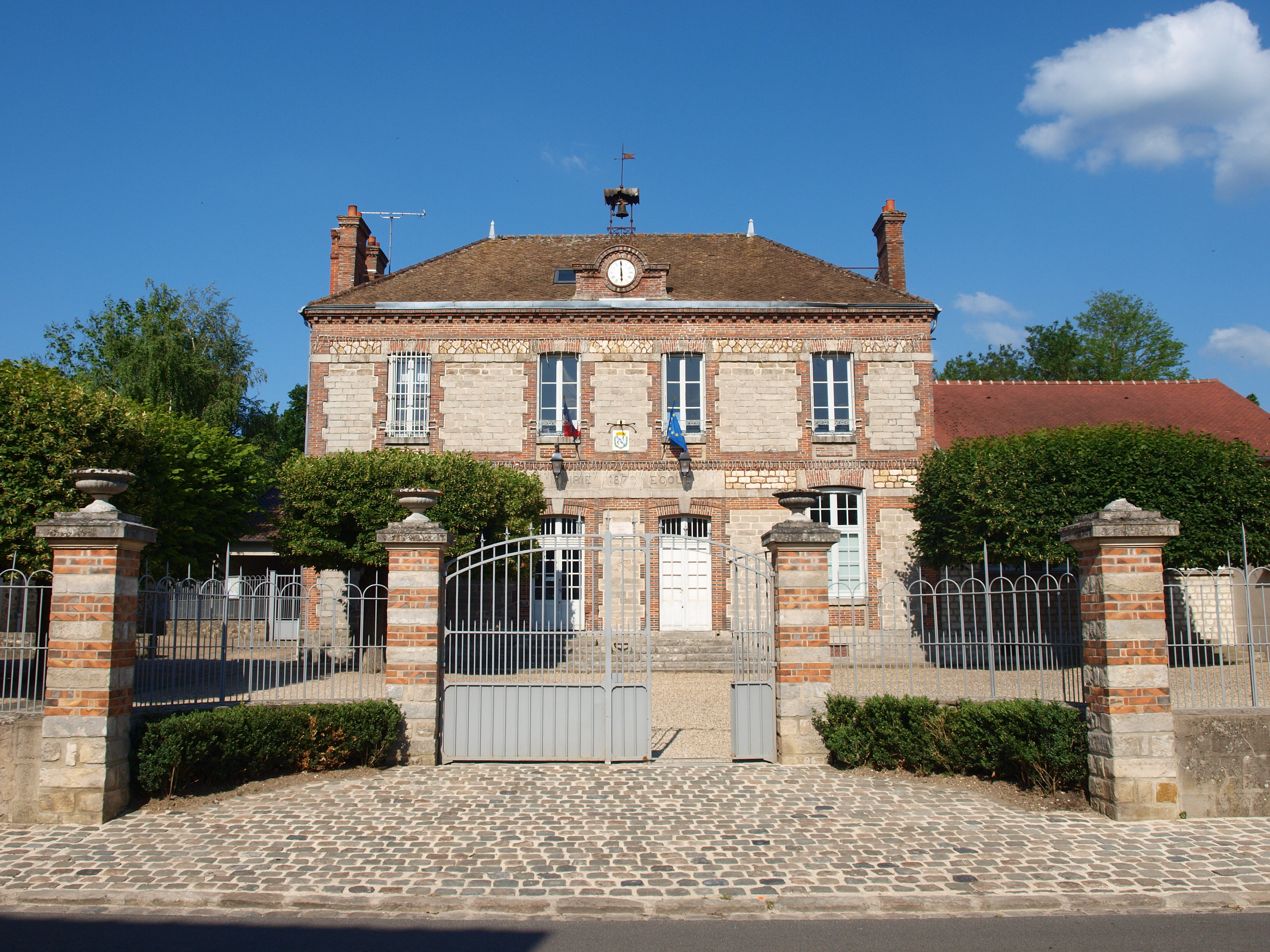
- The town hall in Fleury-en-Bière

- Coat of arms
- Location of Fleury-en-Bière
- Location within France Location within Île-de-France (region)
- Coordinates: 48°27′04″N 2°32′57″E
- Country: France
- Region: Île-de-France
- Department: Seine-et-Marne
- Arrondissement: Fontainebleau
- Canton: Fontainebleau
- Intercommunality: CA Pays de Fontainebleau

Government
  - Mayor (2020–2026): Alain Richard
- Area^{1}: 13.87 km^{2} (5.36 sq mi)
- Highest elevation: 132 m (433 ft)
- Lowest elevation: 60 m (200 ft)
- Population (2023): 652
  - Density: 47.0/km^{2} (122/sq mi)
- Time zone: UTC+01:00 (CET)
  - Summer (DST): UTC+02:00 (CEST)
- INSEE/Postal code: 77185 /77930
- ^{1} French Land Register data, which excludes lakes, ponds, glaciers > 1 km^{2} (0.386 sq mi or 247 acres) and river estuaries.

Fleury-en-Bière (French pronunciation: [flœʁi ɑ̃ bjɛʁ], lit. 'Fleury in Bière') is a commune in the Seine-et-Marne department in the Île-de-France region in north central France.

== Demographics ==
Inhabitants of Fleury-en-Bière are called Fleurysiens.

== See also ==
- Communes of the Seine-et-Marne department
