= Chailly-en-Bière =

- Commune
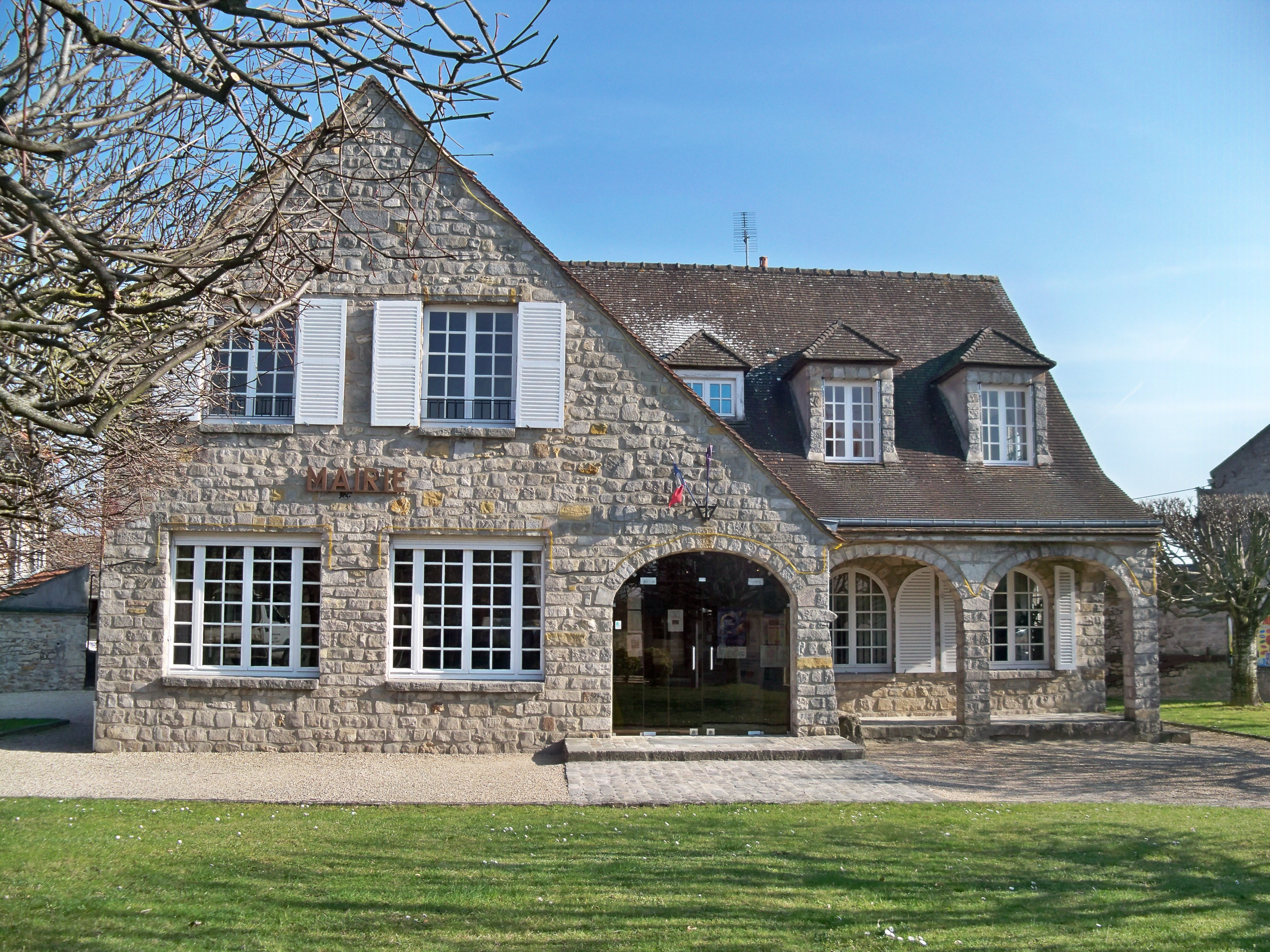
- The town hall in Chailly-en-Bière

- Coat of arms
- Motto: La main à l’œuvre (French: Time to work)
- Location of Chailly-en-Bière
- Location within France Location within Île-de-France (region)
- Coordinates: 48°28′05″N 2°36′28″E
- Country: France
- Region: Île-de-France
- Department: Seine-et-Marne
- Arrondissement: Fontainebleau
- Canton: Fontainebleau
- Intercommunality: CA Pays de Fontainebleau

Government
  - Mayor (2020–2026): Alain Thiery
- Area^{1}: 13.08 km^{2} (5.05 sq mi)
- Highest elevation: 93 m (305 ft)
- Lowest elevation: 76 m (249 ft)
- Population (2023): 2,162
  - Density: 165.3/km^{2} (428.1/sq mi)
- Time zone: UTC+01:00 (CET)
  - Summer (DST): UTC+02:00 (CEST)
- INSEE/Postal code: 77069 /77930
- ^{1} French Land Register data, which excludes lakes, ponds, glaciers > 1 km^{2} (0.386 sq mi or 247 acres) and river estuaries.

Chailly-en-Bière (French pronunciation: [ʃaji ɑ̃ bjɛʁ], lit. 'Chailly in Bière') is a commune in the Seine-et-Marne department in the Île-de-France region in north-central France.

Painters Claude Monet and Frédéric Bazille spent time there together in 1865, and Bazille painted Monet in his work The Improvised Field Hospital.

== Population ==
Historical population
Year	Pop.	±% p.a.
1968	1,040	—
1975	1,315	+3.41%
1982	1,757	+4.23%
1990	2,029	+1.82%
1999	2,129	+0.54%
2007	2,144	+0.09%
2012	1,951	−1.87%
2017	2,037	+0.87%
2023	2,162	+1.00%
Source: INSEE

The inhabitants are called Chaillotins in French.

== See also ==
- Communes of the Seine-et-Marne department
