= Villiers-en-Bière =

- Commune
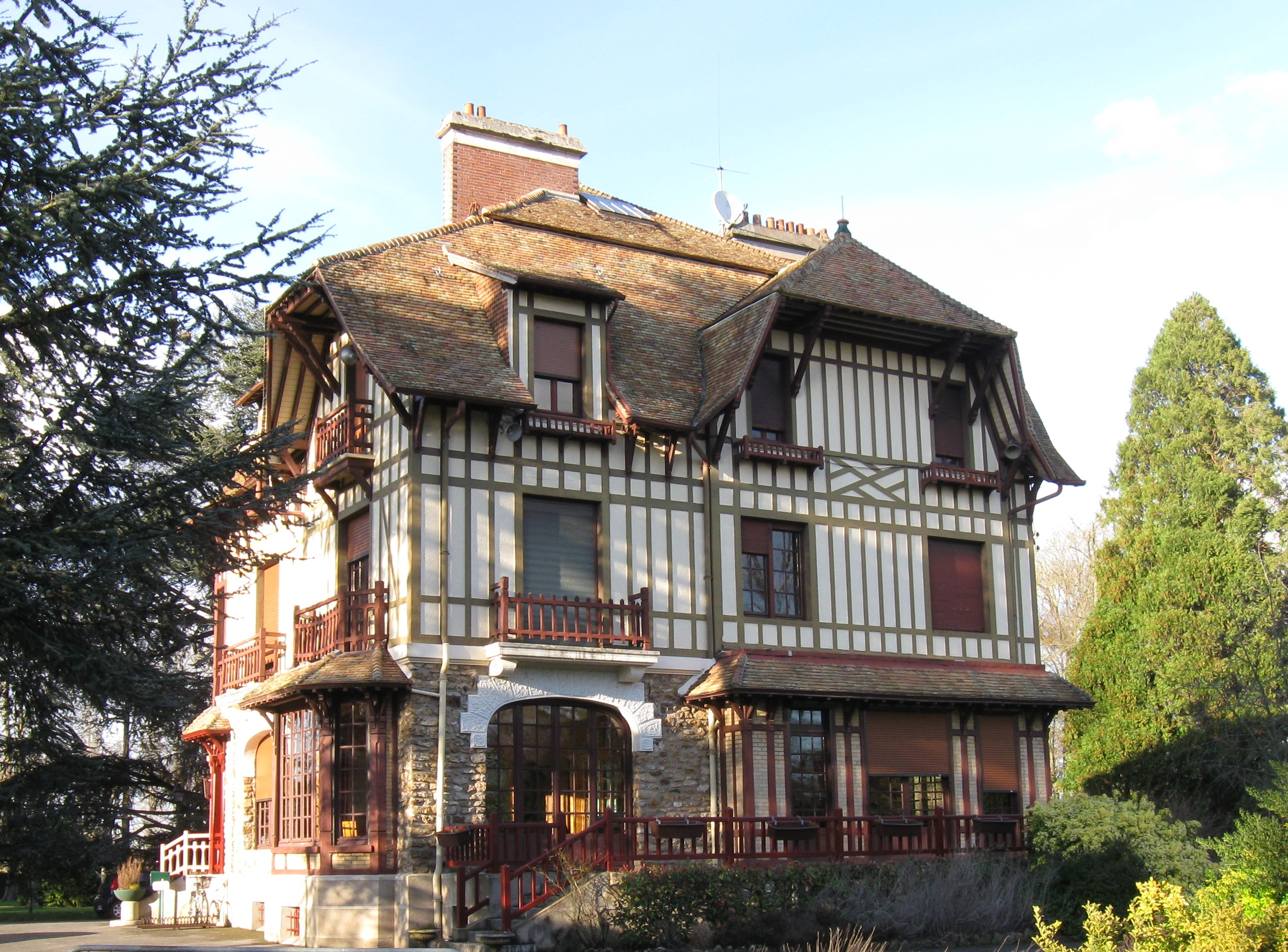
- The town hall in Villiers-en-Bière

- Coat of arms
- Location of Villiers-en-Bière
- Location within France Location within Île-de-France (region)
- Coordinates: 48°29′43″N 2°35′55″E
- Country: France
- Region: Île-de-France
- Department: Seine-et-Marne
- Arrondissement: Melun
- Canton: Fontainebleau
- Intercommunality: CA Melun Val de Seine

Government
  - Mayor (2020–2026): Alain Truchon
- Area^{1}: 10.76 km^{2} (4.15 sq mi)
- Highest elevation: 92 m (302 ft)
- Lowest elevation: 60 m (200 ft)
- Population (2023): 242
  - Density: 22.5/km^{2} (58.3/sq mi)
- Time zone: UTC+01:00 (CET)
  - Summer (DST): UTC+02:00 (CEST)
- INSEE/Postal code: 77518 /77190
- ^{1} French Land Register data, which excludes lakes, ponds, glaciers > 1 km^{2} (0.386 sq mi or 247 acres) and river estuaries.

Villiers-en-Bière (French pronunciation: [vilje ɑ̃ bjɛʁ], lit. 'Villiers in Bière') is a commune in the Seine-et-Marne department in the Île-de-France region in north-central France.

== Demonym ==
Inhabitants of Villiers-en-Bière are called Villiers-en-Bièrois.

== See also ==
- Communes of the Seine-et-Marne department
