= Saint-Sauveur-sur-École =

- Commune
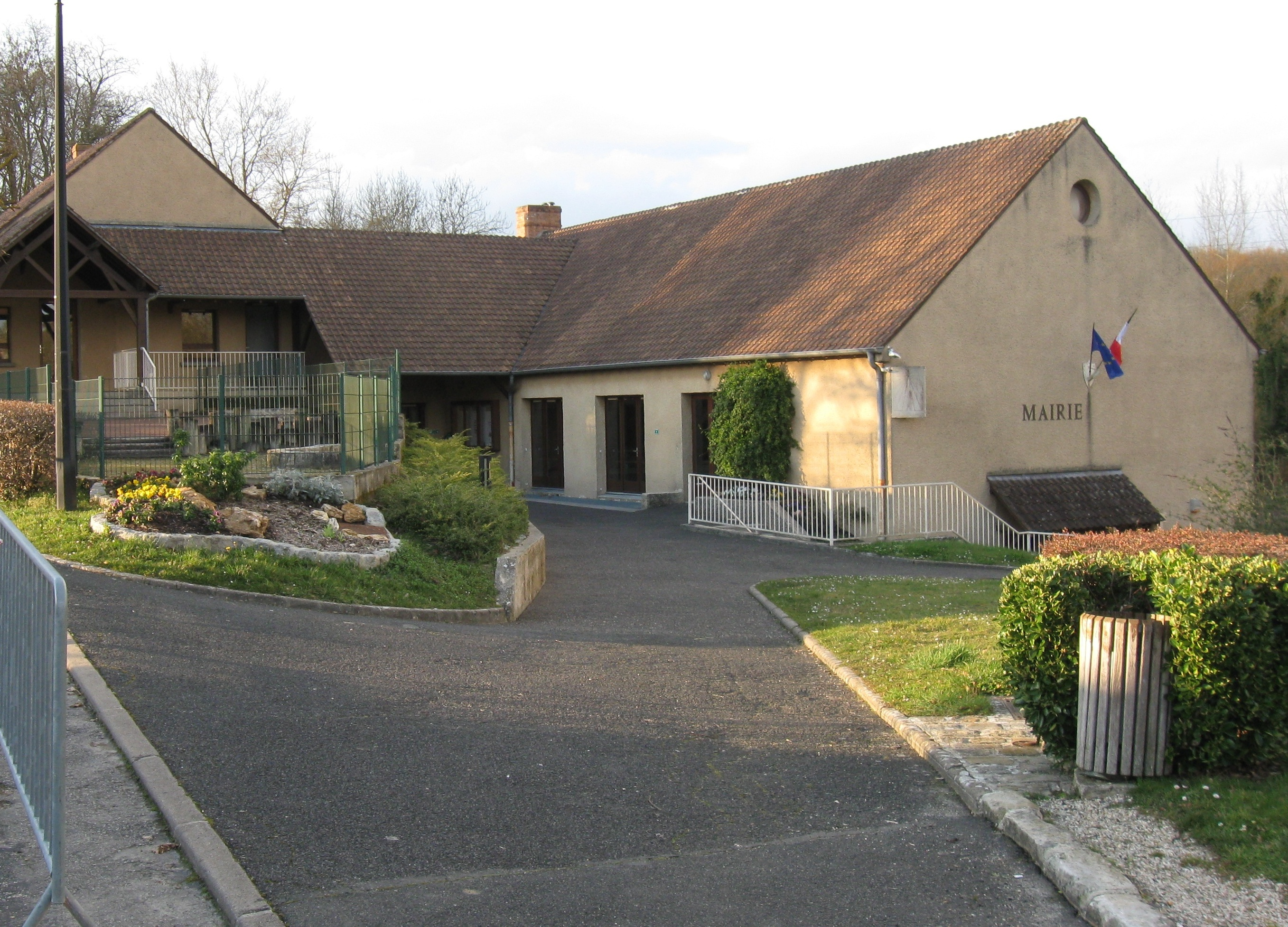
- The town hall in Saint-Sauveur-sur-École

- Coat of arms
- Location of Saint-Sauveur-sur-École
- Location within France Location within Île-de-France (region)
- Coordinates: 48°29′46″N 2°32′52″E
- Country: France
- Region: Île-de-France
- Department: Seine-et-Marne
- Arrondissement: Fontainebleau
- Canton: Fontainebleau
- Intercommunality: CA Pays de Fontainebleau

Government
  - Mayor (2020–2026): Christophe Baguet
- Area^{1}: 7.32 km^{2} (2.83 sq mi)
- Highest elevation: 83 m (272 ft)
- Lowest elevation: 42 m (138 ft)
- Population (2023): 1,125
  - Density: 154/km^{2} (398/sq mi)
- Time zone: UTC+01:00 (CET)
  - Summer (DST): UTC+02:00 (CEST)
- INSEE/Postal code: 77435 /77930
- ^{1} French Land Register data, which excludes lakes, ponds, glaciers > 1 km^{2} (0.386 sq mi or 247 acres) and river estuaries.

Saint-Sauveur-sur-École (French pronunciation: [sɛ̃ sovœʁ syʁ ekɔl]) is a commune in the Seine-et-Marne department in the Île-de-France region in north-central France.

== Demographics ==
Inhabitants of Saint-Sauveur-sur-École are called Saint-Salvatoriens.

== See also ==
- Communes of the Seine-et-Marne department
