= Arbonne-la-Forêt =

- Commune
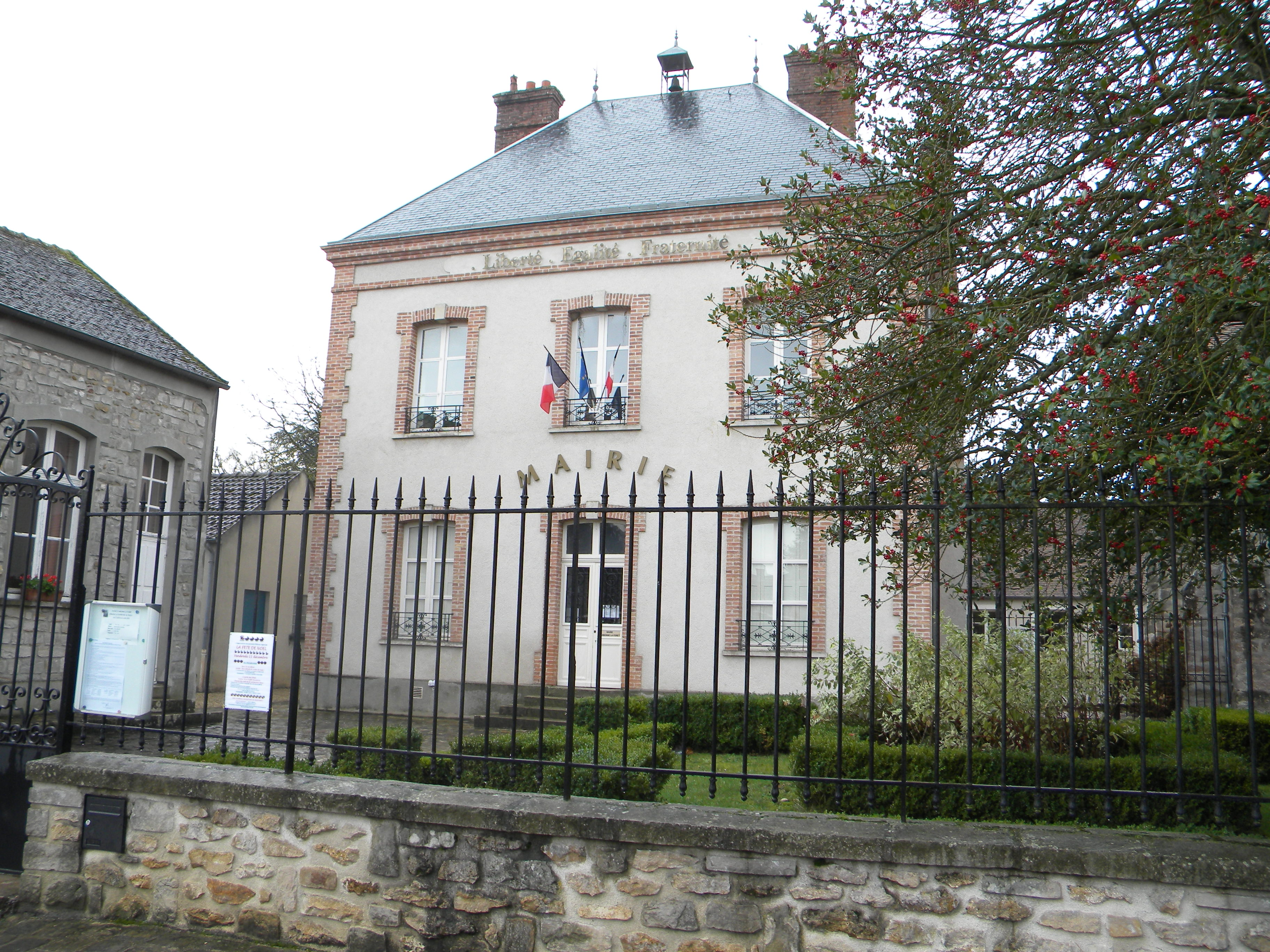
- The town hall in Arbonne-la-Forêt

- Coat of arms
- Location of Arbonne-la-Forêt
- Location within France Location within Île-de-France (region)
- Coordinates: 48°24′49″N 2°33′52″E
- Country: France
- Region: Île-de-France
- Department: Seine-et-Marne
- Arrondissement: Fontainebleau
- Canton: Fontainebleau
- Intercommunality: CA du Pays de Fontainebleau

Government
  - Mayor (2020–2026): Anthony Vautier
- Area^{1}: 15.08 km^{2} (5.82 sq mi)
- Highest elevation: 129 m (423 ft)
- Lowest elevation: 64 m (210 ft)
- Population (2023): 1,021
  - Density: 67.71/km^{2} (175.4/sq mi)
- Demonym: Arbonnais
- Time zone: UTC+01:00 (CET)
  - Summer (DST): UTC+02:00 (CEST)
- INSEE/Postal code: 77006 /77630
- Website: arbonnelaforet.fr
- ^{1} French Land Register data, which excludes lakes, ponds, glaciers > 1 km^{2} (0.386 sq mi or 247 acres) and river estuaries.

Arbonne-la-Forêt (French pronunciation: [aʁbɔn la fɔʁɛ]; lit. 'Arbonne-the-Forest') is a commune in the Seine-et-Marne department in the Île-de-France region in northern France. It is on the departmental border with Essonne at Milly-la-Forêt.

== Demographics ==
The inhabitants are called Arbonnais.

== See also ==
- Communes of the Seine-et-Marne department
