= Canton of Moret-sur-Loing =

Coordinates: 48°21′29″N 2°49′20″E

Moret-sur-Loing
- Former canton
- Interactive map of Moret-sur-Loing
- Country: France
- Region: Île-de-France
- Department: Seine-et-Marne
- No. of communes: {{{nbcomm}}}
- Disbanded: 2015
- Area: 132.49 km^{2} (51.15 sq mi)
- Population (2012): 33,787
  - Density: 255.02/km^{2} (660.49/sq mi)

The canton of Moret-sur-Loing is a former French administrative division, located in the arrondissement of Fontainebleau, in the Seine-et-Marne département (Île-de-France région). It was disbanded following the French canton reorganisation which came into effect in March 2015.

== Demographics ==
Historical population
Year	Pop.	±%
1999	33,226	—
2006	33,811	+1.8%
2012	33,787	−0.1%

== Composition ==
The canton of Moret-sur-Loing was composed of 14 communes:

- Champagne-sur-Seine
- Dormelles
- Écuelles
- Épisy
- Montarlot
- Montigny-sur-Loing
- Moret-sur-Loing
- Saint-Mammès
- Thomery
- Veneux-les-Sablons
- Vernou-la-Celle-sur-Seine
- Villecerf
- Villemer
- Ville-Saint-Jacques

== See also ==
- Cantons of the Seine-et-Marne department
- Communes of the Seine-et-Marne department
