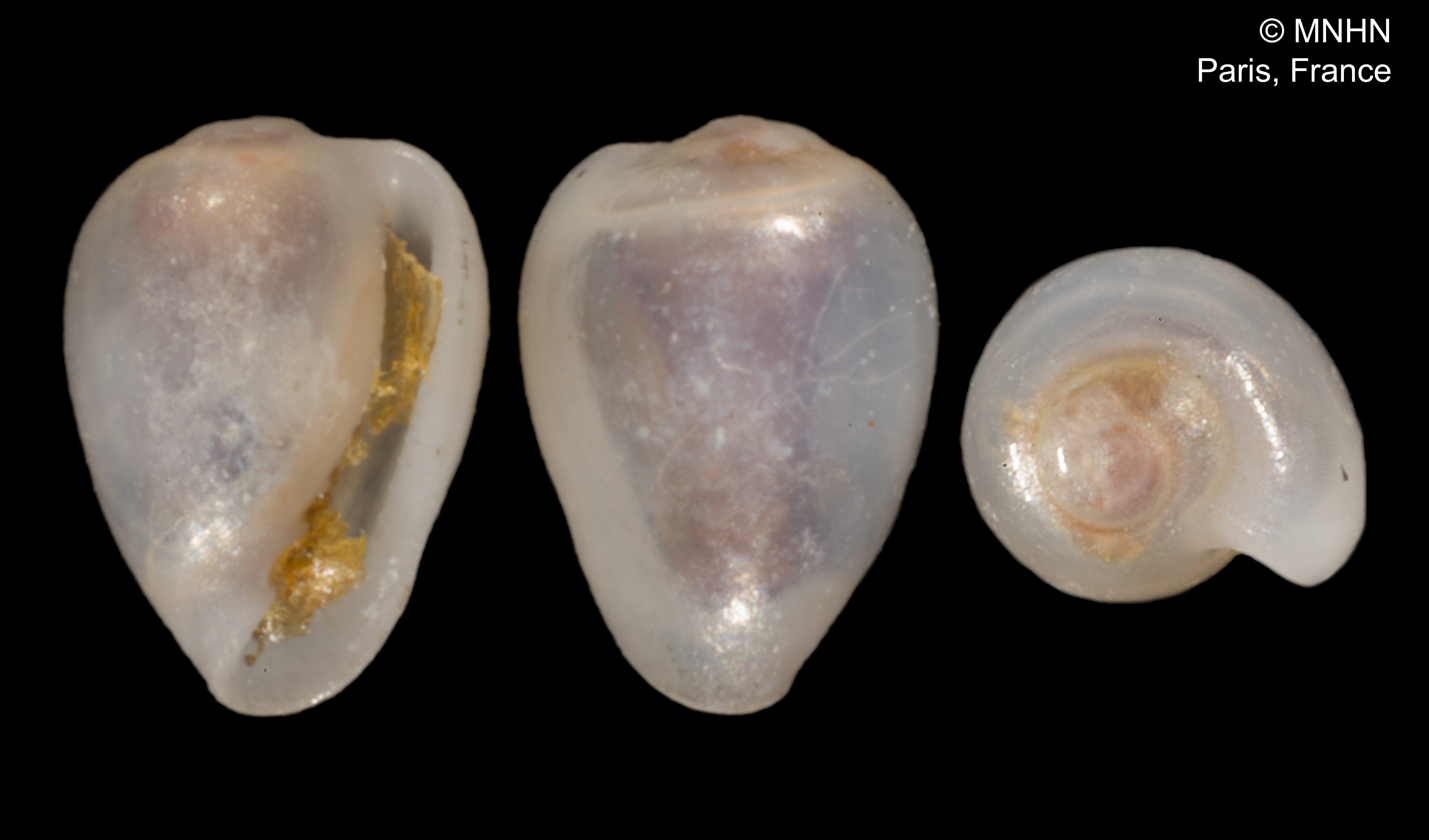
- Shell of Cystiscus angasi (syntype at MNHN, Paris)

Scientific classification
- Kingdom: Animalia
- Phylum: Mollusca
- Class: Gastropoda
- Subclass: Caenogastropoda
- Order: Neogastropoda
- Family: Cystiscidae
- Subfamily: Cystiscinae
- Genus: Cystiscus
- Species: C. angasi

Binomial name
- Cystiscus angasi (Crosse, 1870)

Synonyms
- Cystiscus angasi var. melania (Laseron, 1948); Euliginella angasi (Crosse, 1870); Marginella amphora Laseron, 1948; Marginella angasi Crosse, 1870 (original combination); Marginella angasi var. melania Laseron, 1958; Marginella minima Petterd, 1884; Marginella shorehami Pritchard & Gatliff, 1899; Marginella simsoni Tate & May, 1900

= Cystiscus angasi =

Species of gastropod

Cystiscus angasi is a species of very small sea snail, a marine gastropod mollusk or micromollusk in the family Cystiscidae.

== Description ==
The length of the shell attains 1.8 mm.

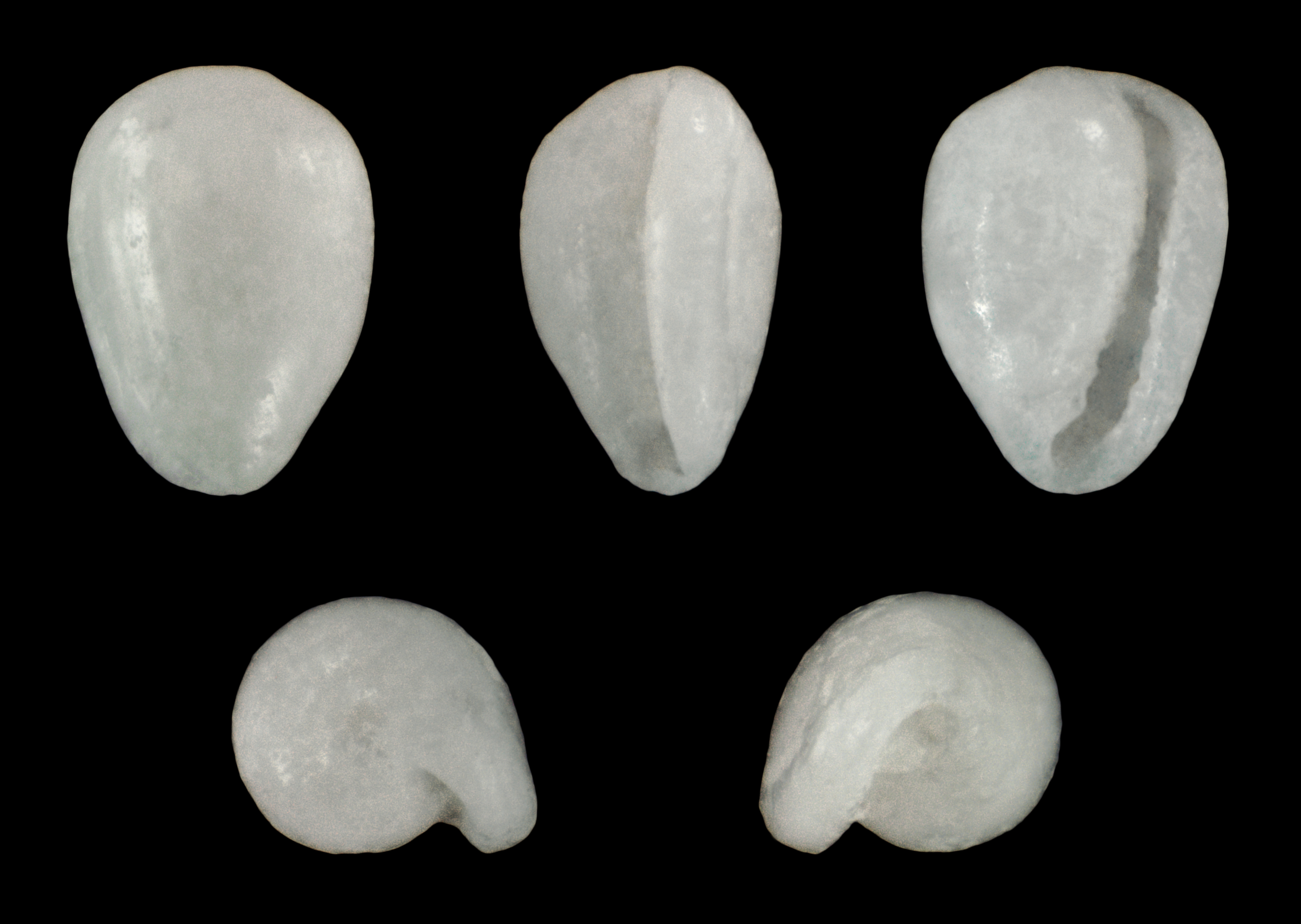
Specimen from Mauritius

The shell is very small, subovate in shape, and smooth. It is relatively thin, translucent, and possesses a brilliant luster with a milky-hyaline color. The spire is sufficiently conspicuous, though it is somewhat flattened.

There are three whorls, which are separated by a suture that is not very distinct. The body whorl is large, nearly equaling the total length of the shell, and it is tapered at the base.

The aperture is elongated and narrow. At the base, the columellar margin is not very conspicuously folded, while the outer lip is thickened and milky-white.

== Distribution ==
This marine species was found off Port Jackson, Australia.
