= Conasprella anaglyptica =

- Shell of Conasprella anaglyptica (museum specimen at Naturalis Biodiversity Center)

Conservation status
- Least Concern (IUCN 3.1)

Scientific classification
- Kingdom: Animalia
- Phylum: Mollusca
- Class: Gastropoda
- Subclass: Caenogastropoda
- Order: Neogastropoda
- Superfamily: Conoidea
- Family: Conidae
- Genus: Conasprella
- Species: C. anaglyptica

Binomial name
- Conasprella anaglyptica (Crosse, 1865)

Synonyms
- Conasprella (Ximeniconus) anaglyptica (Crosse, 1865) · accepted, alternate representation; Conus anaglypticus Crosse, 1865 (original combination); Jaspidiconus anaglypticus (Crosse, 1865)

Species of gastropod

Conasprella anaglyptica is a species of sea snail, a marine gastropod mollusk in the family Conidae, the cone snails and their allies.

Like all species within the genus Conasprella, these cone snails are predatory and venomous. They are capable of stinging humans, therefore live ones should be handled carefully or not at all.

== Description ==
The size of the shell varies between 10 mm and 20 mm.

== Distribution ==
This marine species occurs off the Antilles.
