= Orvanne =

Commune in Seine-et-Marne, France

- Part of Moret-Loing-et-Orvanne
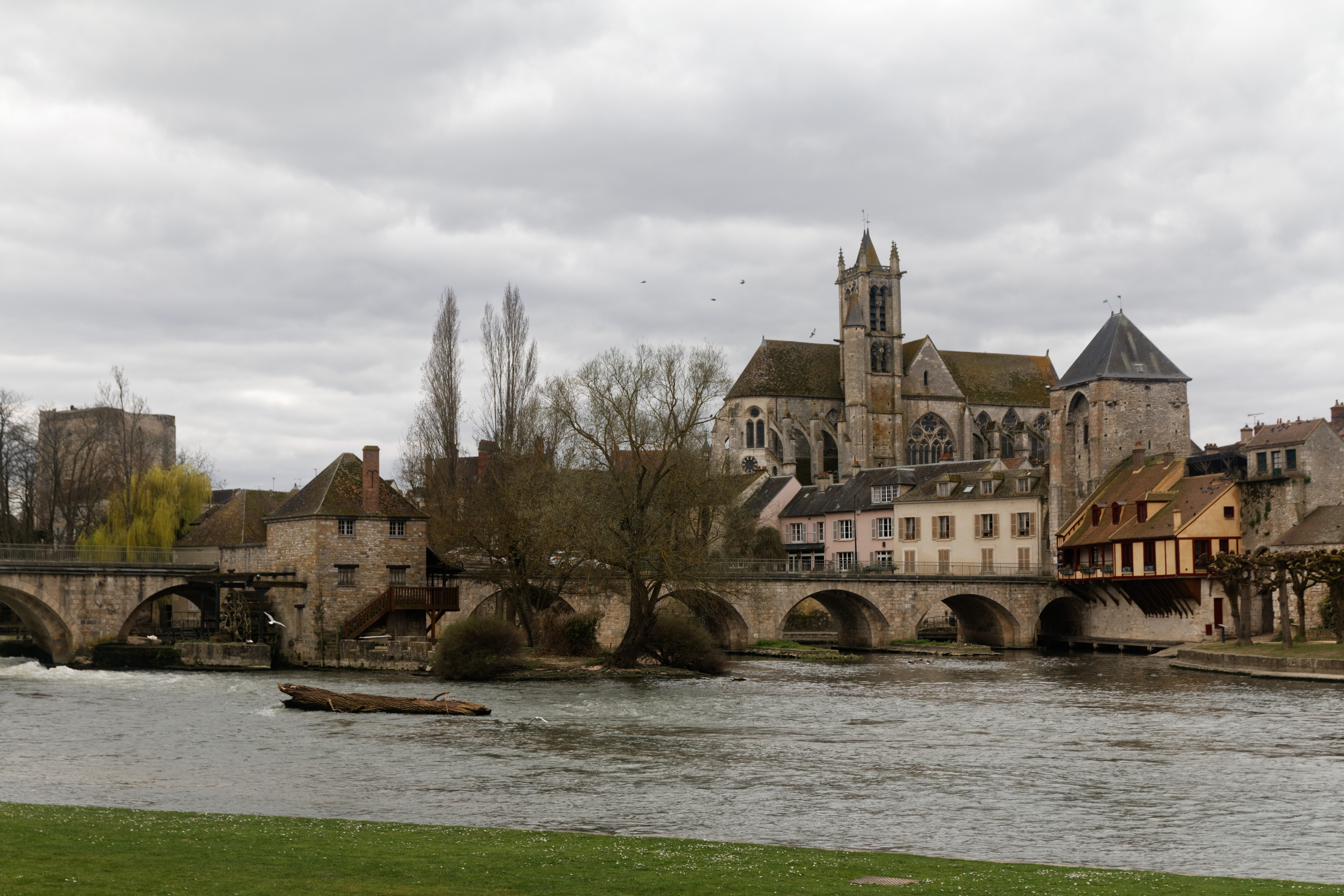
- The Loing
- Location of Orvanne
- Location within France Location within Île-de-France (region)
- Coordinates: 48°22′25″N 2°48′51″E
- Country: France
- Region: Île-de-France
- Department: Seine-et-Marne
- Arrondissement: Fontainebleau
- Canton: Montereau-Fault-Yonne
- Commune: Moret-Loing-et-Orvanne
- Area^{1}: 16.75 km^{2} (6.47 sq mi)
- Population (2015): 6,795
  - Density: 405.7/km^{2} (1,051/sq mi)
- Time zone: UTC+01:00 (CET)
  - Summer (DST): UTC+02:00 (CEST)
- Postal code: 77250
- ^{1} French Land Register data, which excludes lakes, ponds, glaciers > 1 km^{2} (0.386 sq mi or 247 acres) and river estuaries.

Orvanne (French pronunciation: [ɔʁvan]) was a short-lived commune in the department of Seine-et-Marne in north-central France. The commune was established on 1 January 2015 by merger of the former communes of Écuelles and Moret-sur-Loing. On 1 January 2016, it was merged into the new commune Moret-Loing-et-Orvanne.

== See also ==
- Communes of the Seine-et-Marne department
