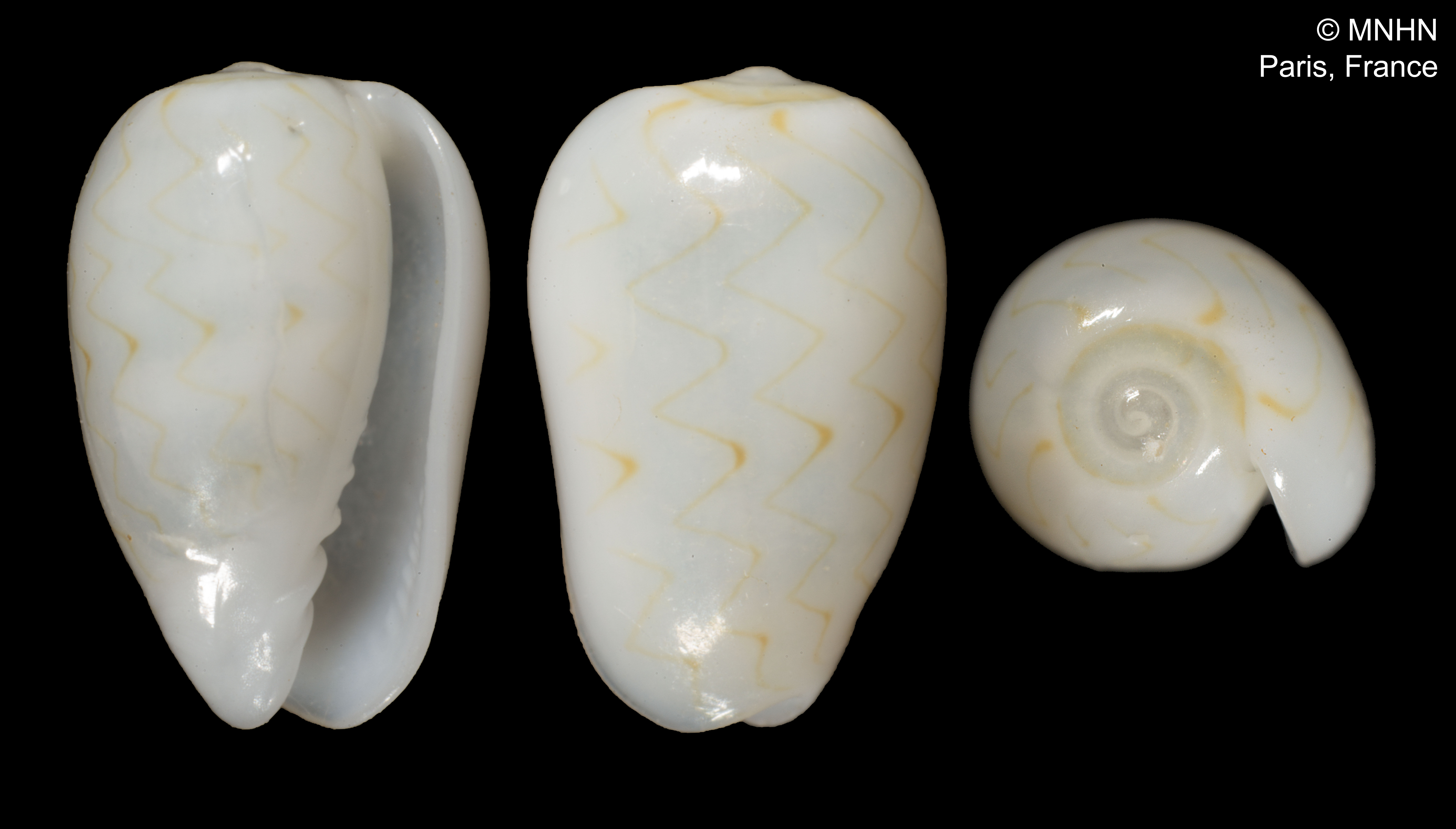
- Shell of Gibberula lifouana (lectotype at MNHN, Paris)

Scientific classification
- Kingdom: Animalia
- Phylum: Mollusca
- Class: Gastropoda
- Subclass: Caenogastropoda
- Order: Neogastropoda
- Family: Cystiscidae
- Subfamily: Cystiscinae
- Genus: Gibberula
- Species: G. lifouana

Binomial name
- Gibberula lifouana (Crosse, 1871)

Synonyms
- Marginella hervieri Bavay, 1922; Marginella lifouana Crosse, 1871

= Gibberula lifouana =

Species of gastropod

Gibberula lifouana is a species of sea snail, a marine gastropod mollusk, in the family Cystiscidae.

== Distribution ==
This marine species occurs off New Caledonia.
