= Conus subachatinus =

Scientific classification
- Kingdom: Animalia
- Phylum: Mollusca
- Class: Gastropoda
- Subclass: Caenogastropoda
- Order: Neogastropoda
- Superfamily: Conoidea
- Family: Conidae
- Genus: Conus
- Species: †C. subachatinus

Binomial name
- †Conus subachatinus Crosse, 1858

Extinct species of gastropod

Conus subachatinus is an extinct species of sea snail, a marine gastropod mollusk, in the family Conidae, the cone snails and their allies.
