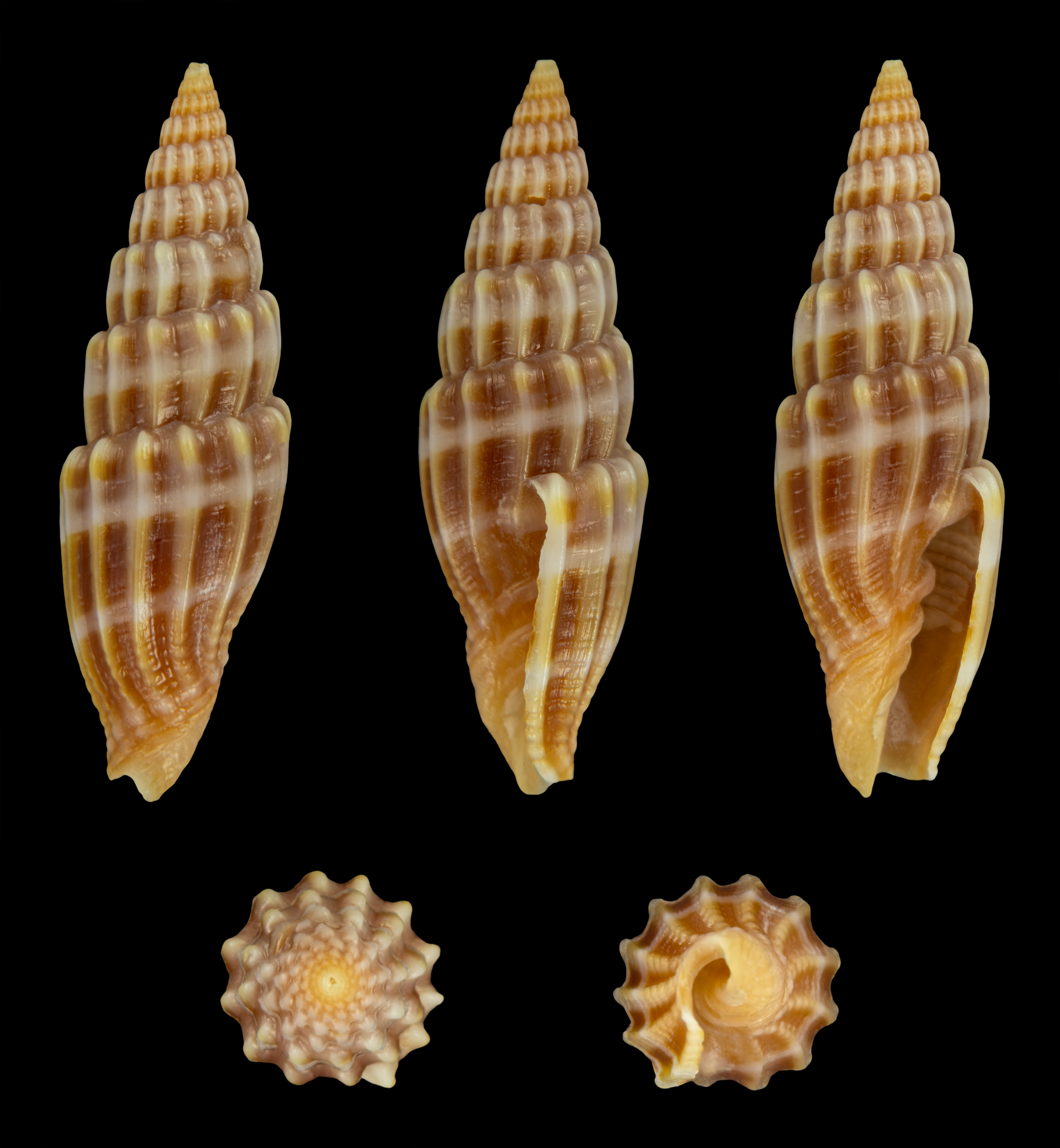
- Vexillum michaui

Scientific classification
- Kingdom: Animalia
- Phylum: Mollusca
- Class: Gastropoda
- Subclass: Caenogastropoda
- Order: Neogastropoda
- Superfamily: Turbinelloidea
- Family: Costellariidae
- Genus: Vexillum
- Species: V. michaui

Binomial name
- Vexillum michaui Crosse & Fischer, 1864)

Synonyms
- Mitra alauda Sowerby II& Sowerby III, 1874; Mitra deshayesi var. nigricans Dautzenberg & Bouge, 1923 (non Pease, 1865); Mitra michaui Crosse & P. Fischer, 1864 (basionym); Vexillum alauda (Sowerby II, 1874); Vexillum deshayesii alauda (Sowerby II, 1874)

= Vexillum michaui =

Species of gastropod

Vexillum michaui is a species of small sea snail, marine gastropod mollusk in the family Costellariidae, the ribbed miters.

There are two subspecies:

- Vexillum michaui michaui Crosse & P. Fischer, 1864
- Vexillum michaui wilsi Buijse & Dekker, 1990

== Description ==
The length of the shell varies between 16 mm and 27 mm.

== Distribution ==
This species occurs in the Indian Ocean in the Mascarene Basin and Mozambique; off the Philippines, Vietnam, the Solomon Islands and New Caledonia.
