= Nonville =

Nonville is the name of two communes in France:

- Nonville, in the Seine-et-Marne département
- Nonville, in the Vosges département
