= Communauté de communes Moret Seine et Loing =

Federation of municipalities in France

Coordinates: 48.37°N 2.81°E

Moret Seine et Loing
- Communauté de communes
- Country: France
- Region: Île-de-France
- Department: Seine-et-Marne
- No. of communes: {{{nbcomm}}}
- Established: 1972

Government
  - President: Patrick Septiers
- Area: 228.24 km^{2} (88.12 sq mi)
- Population (2018): 38,818
  - Density: 170.08/km^{2} (440.49/sq mi)
- Website: www.ccmsl.fr

The Communauté de communes Moret Seine et Loing is a federation of municipalities (communauté de communes) in the Seine-et-Marne département and in the Île-de-France région of France. Its area is 228.2 km^{2}, and its population was 38,818 in 2018.

== Composition ==
The communauté de communes consists of the following 18 communes:

1. Champagne-sur-Seine
2. Dormelles
3. Flagy
4. La Genevraye
5. Montigny-sur-Loing
6. Moret-Loing-et-Orvanne
7. Nanteau-sur-Lunain
8. Nonville
9. Paley
10. Remauville
11. Saint-Mammès
12. Thomery
13. Treuzy-Levelay
14. Vernou-la-Celle-sur-Seine
15. Villecerf
16. Villemaréchal
17. Villemer
18. Ville-Saint-Jacques

== See also ==
- Communes of the Seine-et-Marne department
