= Courtoin =

- Commune
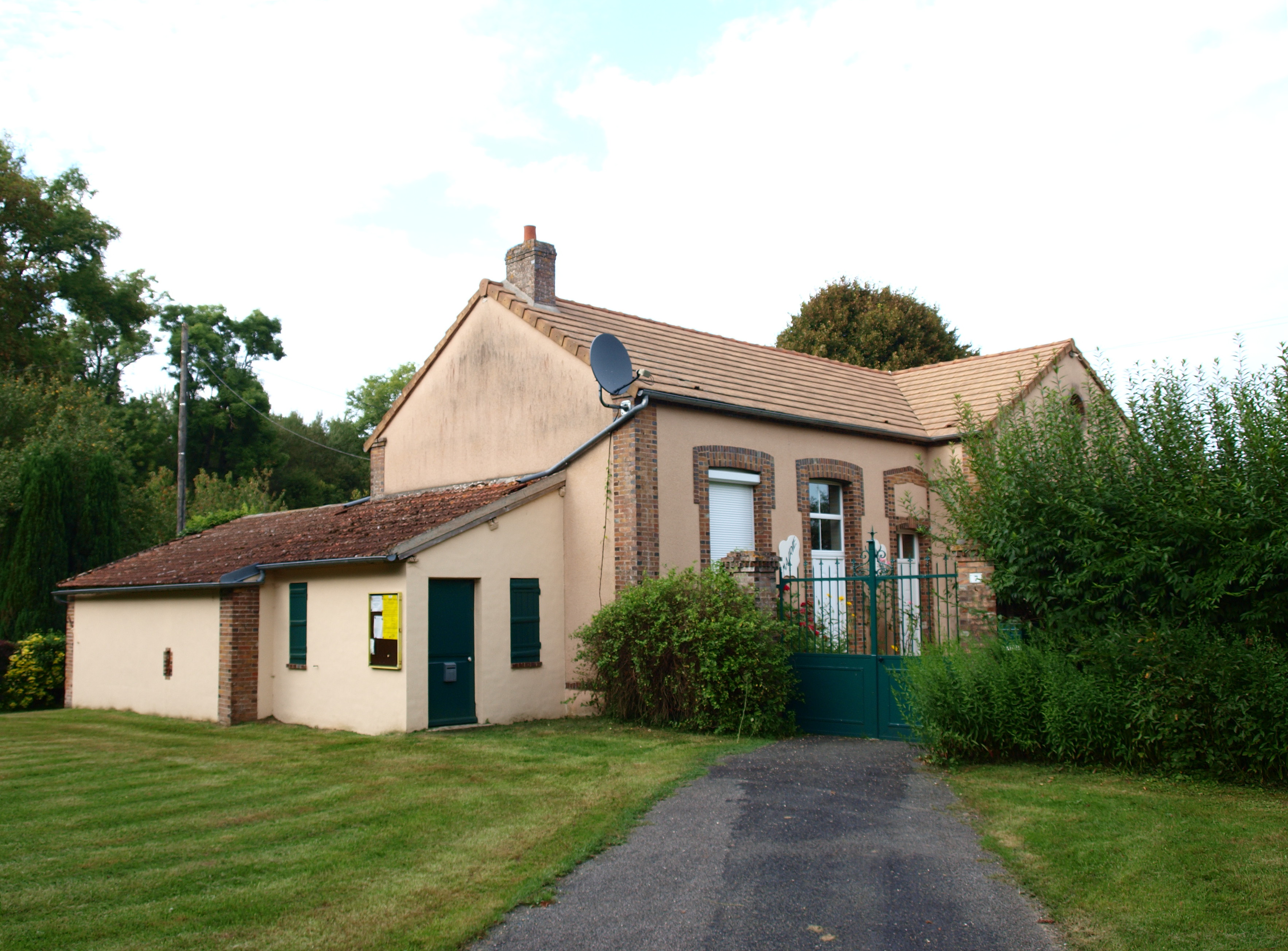
- The town hall in Courtoin
- Location of Courtoin
- Location within France Location within Bourgogne-Franche-Comté
- Coordinates: 48°07′28″N 3°06′32″E
- Country: France
- Region: Bourgogne-Franche-Comté
- Department: Yonne
- Arrondissement: Sens
- Canton: Gâtinais en Bourgogne

Government
  - Mayor (2020–2026): Christine Aita
- Area^{1}: 6.15 km^{2} (2.37 sq mi)
- Highest elevation: 190 m (620 ft)
- Lowest elevation: 164 m (538 ft)
- Population (2023): 39
  - Density: 6.3/km^{2} (16/sq mi)
- Time zone: UTC+01:00 (CET)
  - Summer (DST): UTC+02:00 (CEST)
- INSEE/Postal code: 89126 /89150
- ^{1} French Land Register data, which excludes lakes, ponds, glaciers > 1 km^{2} (0.386 sq mi or 247 acres) and river estuaries.

Courtoin (French pronunciation: [kuʁtwɛ̃]) is a commune in the Yonne department in Bourgogne-Franche-Comté in north-central France.

== Geography ==
The commune is traversed by the Lunain river.

== See also ==
- Communes of the Yonne department
