= Égriselles-le-Bocage =

- Commune
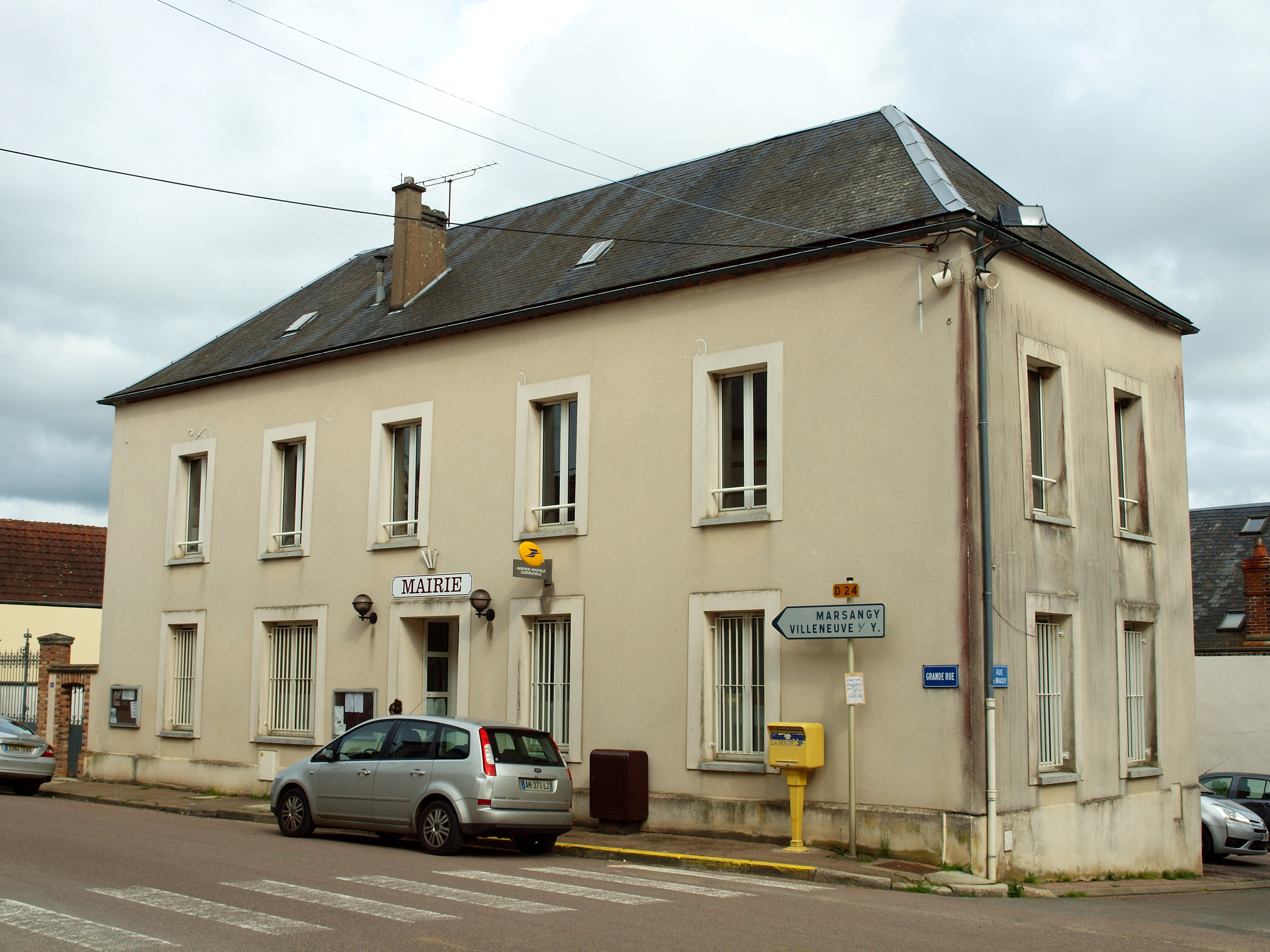
- The town hall in Égriselles-le-Bocage
- Location of Égriselles-le-Bocage
- Location within France Location within Bourgogne-Franche-Comté
- Coordinates: 48°07′15″N 3°10′59″E
- Country: France
- Region: Bourgogne-Franche-Comté
- Department: Yonne
- Arrondissement: Sens
- Canton: Gâtinais en Bourgogne

Government
  - Mayor (2020–2026): Christian Deschamps
- Area^{1}: 23.69 km^{2} (9.15 sq mi)
- Elevation: 180 m (590 ft)
- Highest elevation: 199 m (653 ft)
- Lowest elevation: 103 m (338 ft)
- Population (2023): 1,381
  - Density: 58.29/km^{2} (151.0/sq mi)
- Time zone: UTC+01:00 (CET)
  - Summer (DST): UTC+02:00 (CEST)
- INSEE/Postal code: 89151 /89500
- ^{1} French Land Register data, which excludes lakes, ponds, glaciers > 1 km^{2} (0.386 sq mi or 247 acres) and river estuaries.

Égriselles-le-Bocage (French pronunciation: [eɡʁizɛl lə bɔkaʒ]) is a commune in the Yonne department in Bourgogne-Franche-Comté in north-central France.

Its inhabitants are called Égrisellois.

== Geography ==
The Lunain river has its source in the commune.

== See also ==
- Communes of the Yonne department
