= La Belliole =

- Commune
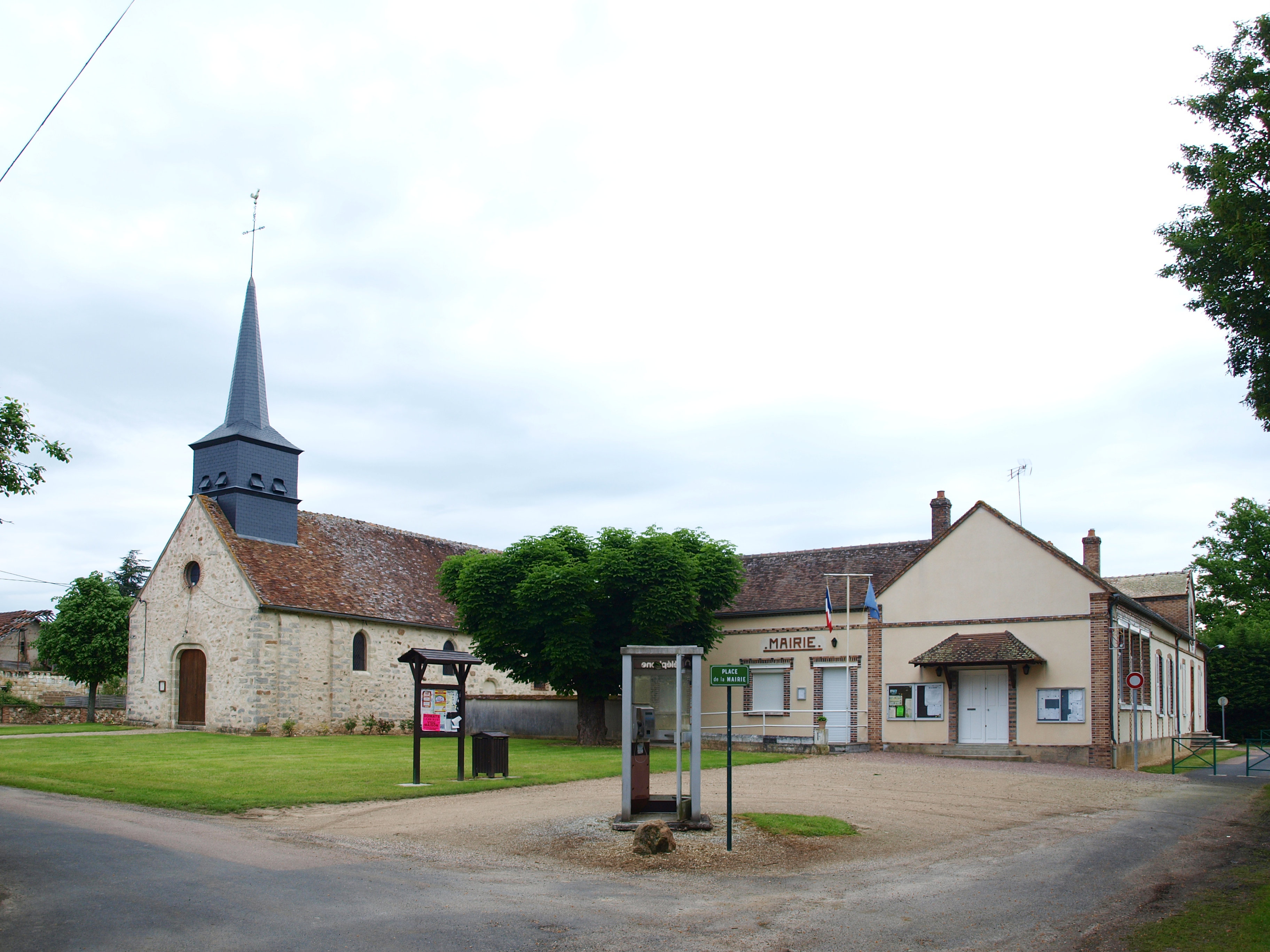
- The church and town hall in La Belliole
- Location of La Belliole
- Location within France Location within Bourgogne-Franche-Comté
- Coordinates: 48°08′50″N 3°05′28″E
- Country: France
- Region: Bourgogne-Franche-Comté
- Department: Yonne
- Arrondissement: Sens
- Canton: Gâtinais en Bourgogne

Government
  - Mayor (2020–2026): Loïc Barret
- Area^{1}: 8.49 km^{2} (3.28 sq mi)
- Highest elevation: 177 m (581 ft)
- Lowest elevation: 151 m (495 ft)
- Population (2023): 216
  - Density: 25.4/km^{2} (65.9/sq mi)
- Time zone: UTC+01:00 (CET)
  - Summer (DST): UTC+02:00 (CEST)
- INSEE/Postal code: 89036 /89150
- ^{1} French Land Register data, which excludes lakes, ponds, glaciers > 1 km^{2} (0.386 sq mi or 247 acres) and river estuaries.

La Belliole (French pronunciation: [la beljɔl]) is a commune in the Yonne department in Bourgogne-Franche-Comté in north-central France.

== Geography ==
The river Lunain flows through the eastern part of the commune.

== See also ==
- Communes of the Yonne department
