= La Genevraye =

- Commune
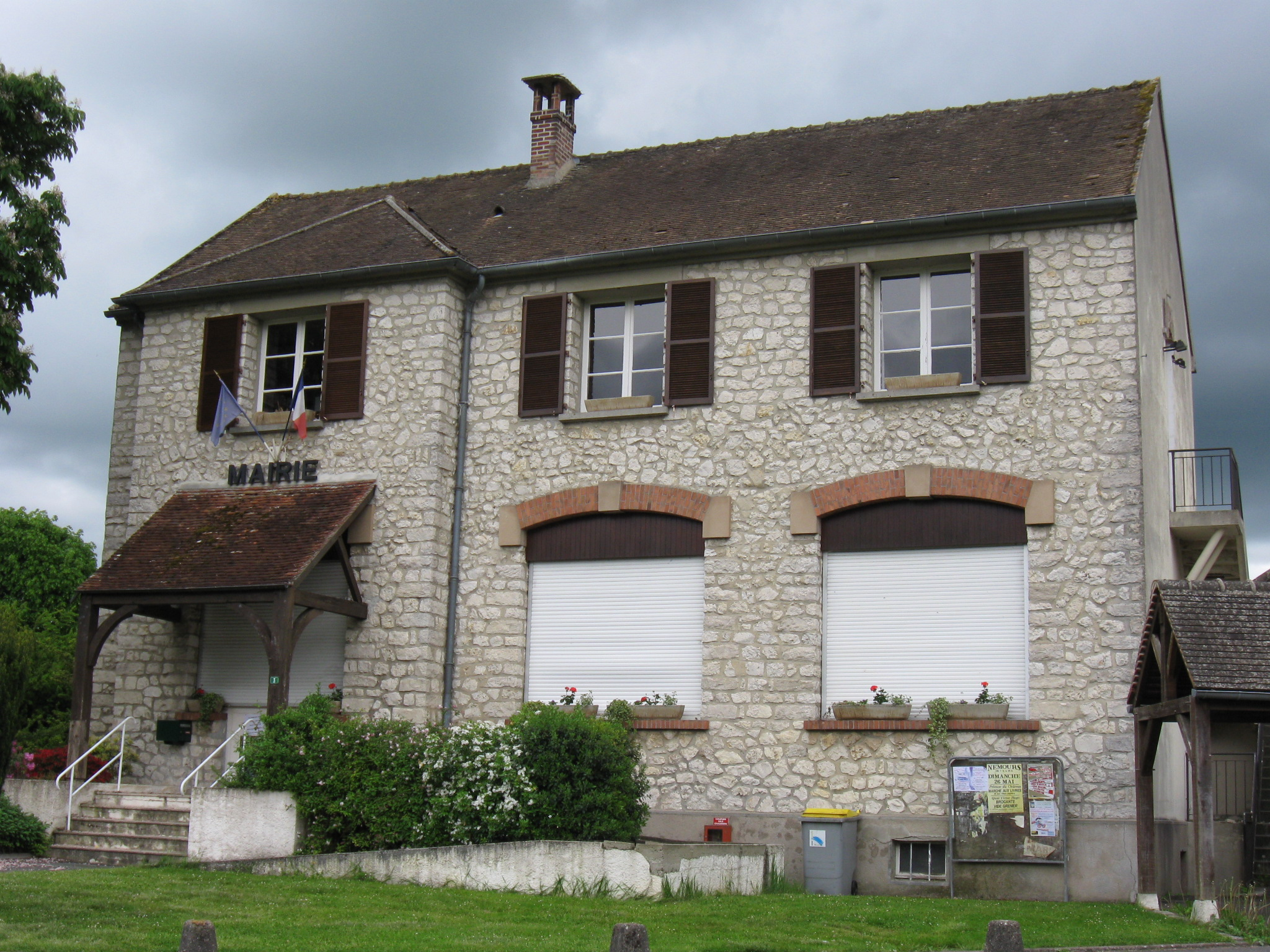
- The town hall in La Genevraye

- Coat of arms
- Location of La Genevraye
- Location within France Location within Île-de-France (region)
- Coordinates: 48°19′15″N 2°44′59″E
- Country: France
- Region: Île-de-France
- Department: Seine-et-Marne
- Arrondissement: Fontainebleau
- Canton: Nemours
- Intercommunality: CC Moret Seine et Loing

Government
  - Mayor (2022–2026): Pascal Otlinghaus
- Area^{1}: 13.16 km^{2} (5.08 sq mi)
- Highest elevation: 79 m (259 ft)
- Lowest elevation: 51 m (167 ft)
- Population (2023): 840
  - Density: 64/km^{2} (170/sq mi)
- Time zone: UTC+01:00 (CET)
  - Summer (DST): UTC+02:00 (CEST)
- INSEE/Postal code: 77202 /77690
- ^{1} French Land Register data, which excludes lakes, ponds, glaciers > 1 km^{2} (0.386 sq mi or 247 acres) and river estuaries.

La Genevraye (French pronunciation: [la ʒənvʁɛ]) is a commune in the Seine-et-Marne department in the Île-de-France region in north-central France.

== Geography ==
The commune is traversed by the Lunain river. The Canal du Loing passes through the commune

== Demographics ==
Inhabitants are called Genevriens.

== See also ==
- Communes of the Seine-et-Marne department
