= Villemaréchal =

- Commune
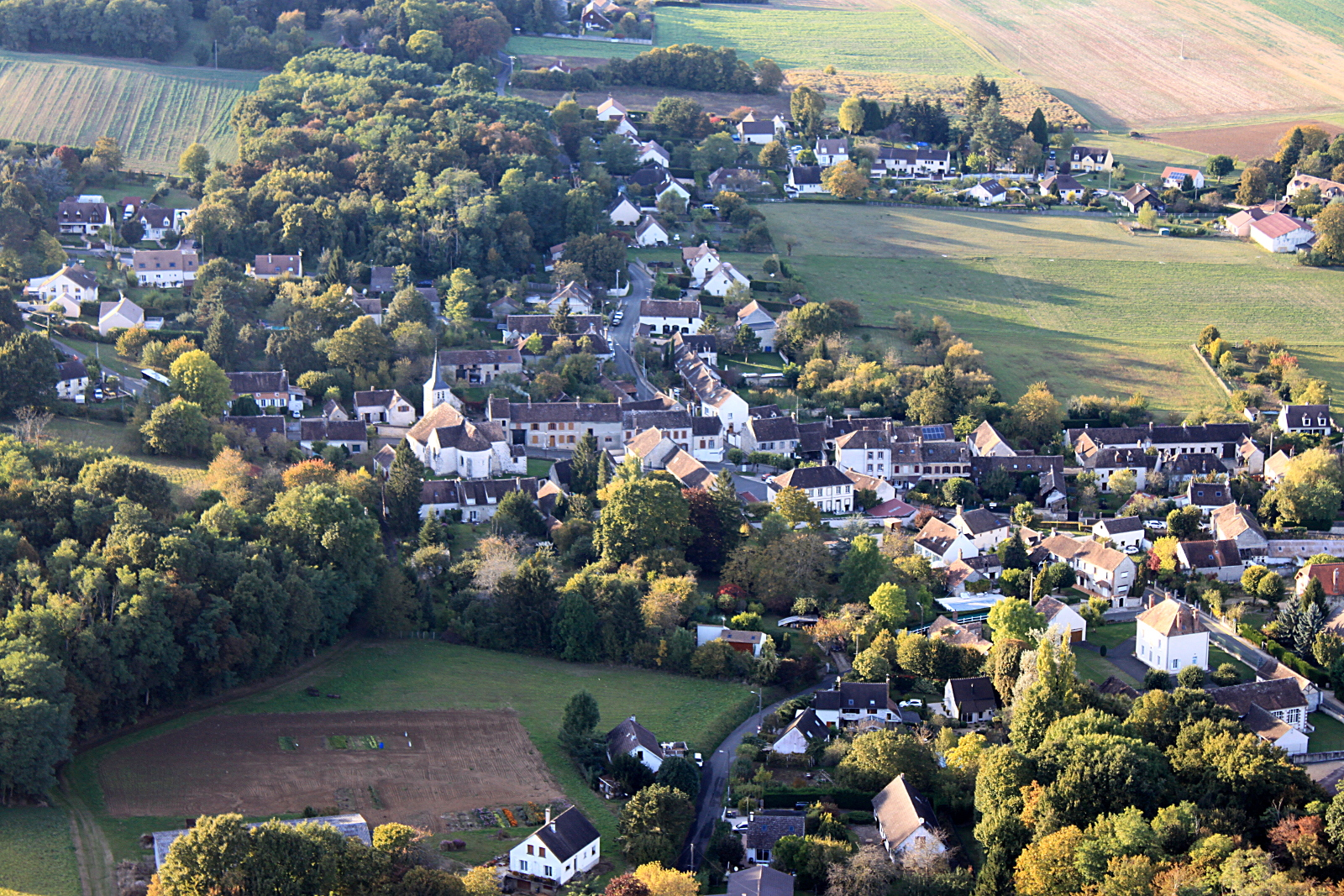
- A general view of Villemaréchal
- Location of Villemaréchal
- Location within France Location within Île-de-France (region)
- Coordinates: 48°16′06″N 2°52′09″E
- Country: France
- Region: Île-de-France
- Department: Seine-et-Marne
- Arrondissement: Fontainebleau
- Canton: Nemours
- Intercommunality: CC Moret Seine et Loing

Government
  - Mayor (2020–2026): Laurence Klein
- Area^{1}: 17.46 km^{2} (6.74 sq mi)
- Highest elevation: 148 m (486 ft)
- Lowest elevation: 82 m (269 ft)
- Population (2023): 1,055
  - Density: 60.42/km^{2} (156.5/sq mi)
- Time zone: UTC+01:00 (CET)
  - Summer (DST): UTC+02:00 (CEST)
- INSEE/Postal code: 77504 /77710
- ^{1} French Land Register data, which excludes lakes, ponds, glaciers > 1 km^{2} (0.386 sq mi or 247 acres) and river estuaries.

Villemaréchal (French pronunciation: [vilmaʁeʃal]) is a commune in the Seine-et-Marne department in the Île-de-France region in north-central France. On 1 January 2019, the former commune Saint-Ange-le-Viel was merged into Villemaréchal.

== Demographics ==
Inhabitants of Villemaréchal are called Villemarchais.

== See also ==
- Communes of the Seine-et-Marne department
