= Treuzy-Levelay =

- Commune
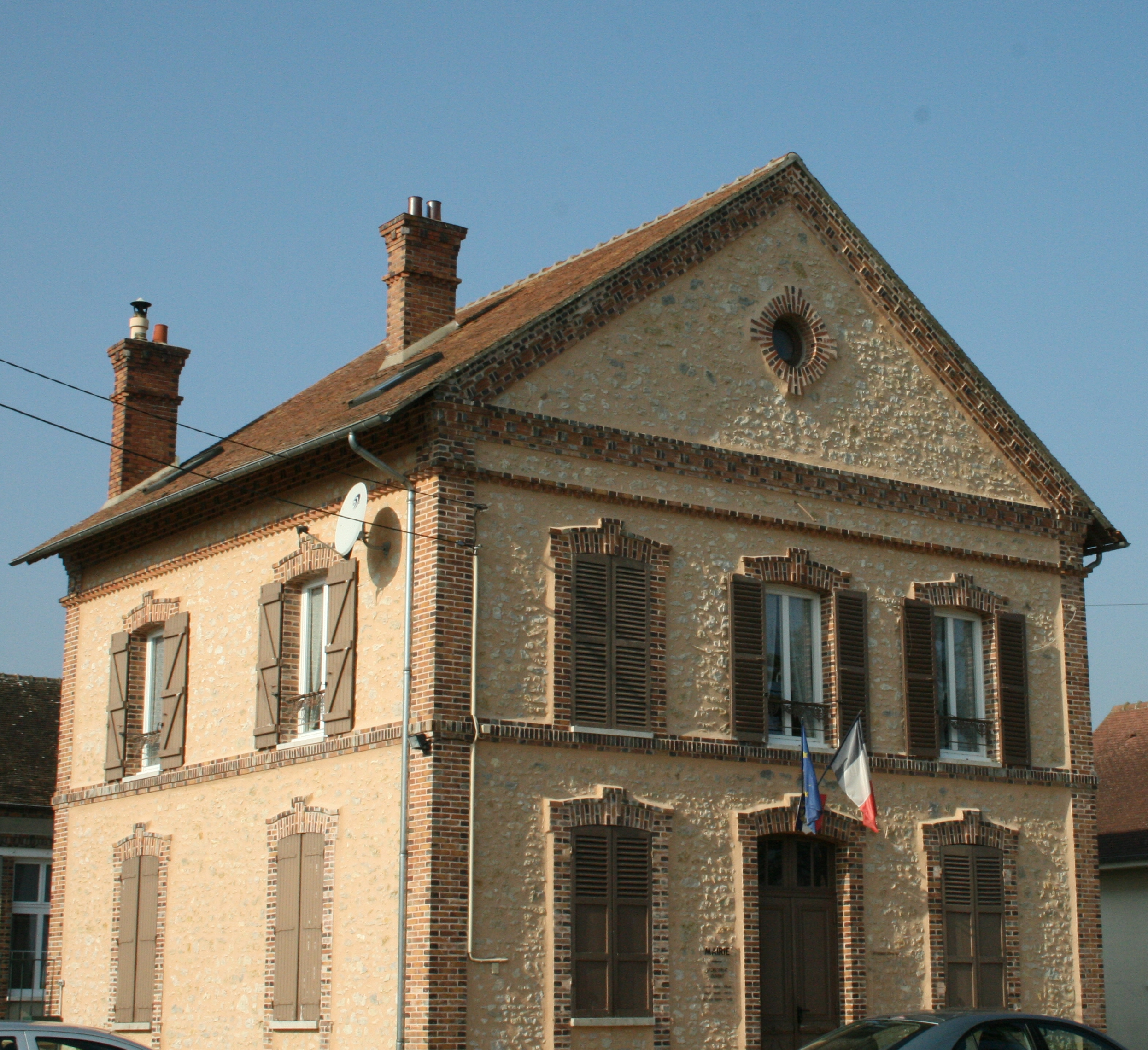
- The town hall in Treuzy-Levelay
- Location of Treuzy-Levelay
- Location within France Location within Île-de-France (region)
- Coordinates: 48°16′20″N 2°48′52″E
- Country: France
- Region: Île-de-France
- Department: Seine-et-Marne
- Arrondissement: Fontainebleau
- Canton: Nemours
- Intercommunality: CC Moret Seine et Loing

Government
  - Mayor (2020–2026): Patricia Pillot
- Area^{1}: 14.10 km^{2} (5.44 sq mi)
- Highest elevation: 140 m (460 ft)
- Lowest elevation: 66 m (217 ft)
- Population (2023): 458
  - Density: 32.5/km^{2} (84.1/sq mi)
- Time zone: UTC+01:00 (CET)
  - Summer (DST): UTC+02:00 (CEST)
- INSEE/Postal code: 77473 /77710
- ^{1} French Land Register data, which excludes lakes, ponds, glaciers > 1 km^{2} (0.386 sq mi or 247 acres) and river estuaries.

Treuzy-Levelay is a commune in the Seine-et-Marne department in the Île-de-France region in north-central France.

== Demographics ==
Inhabitants of Treuzy-Levelay are called Velytreuziens.

== Geography ==
The commune is traversed by the Lunain river.

== See also ==
- Communes of the Seine-et-Marne department
