= Lunain =

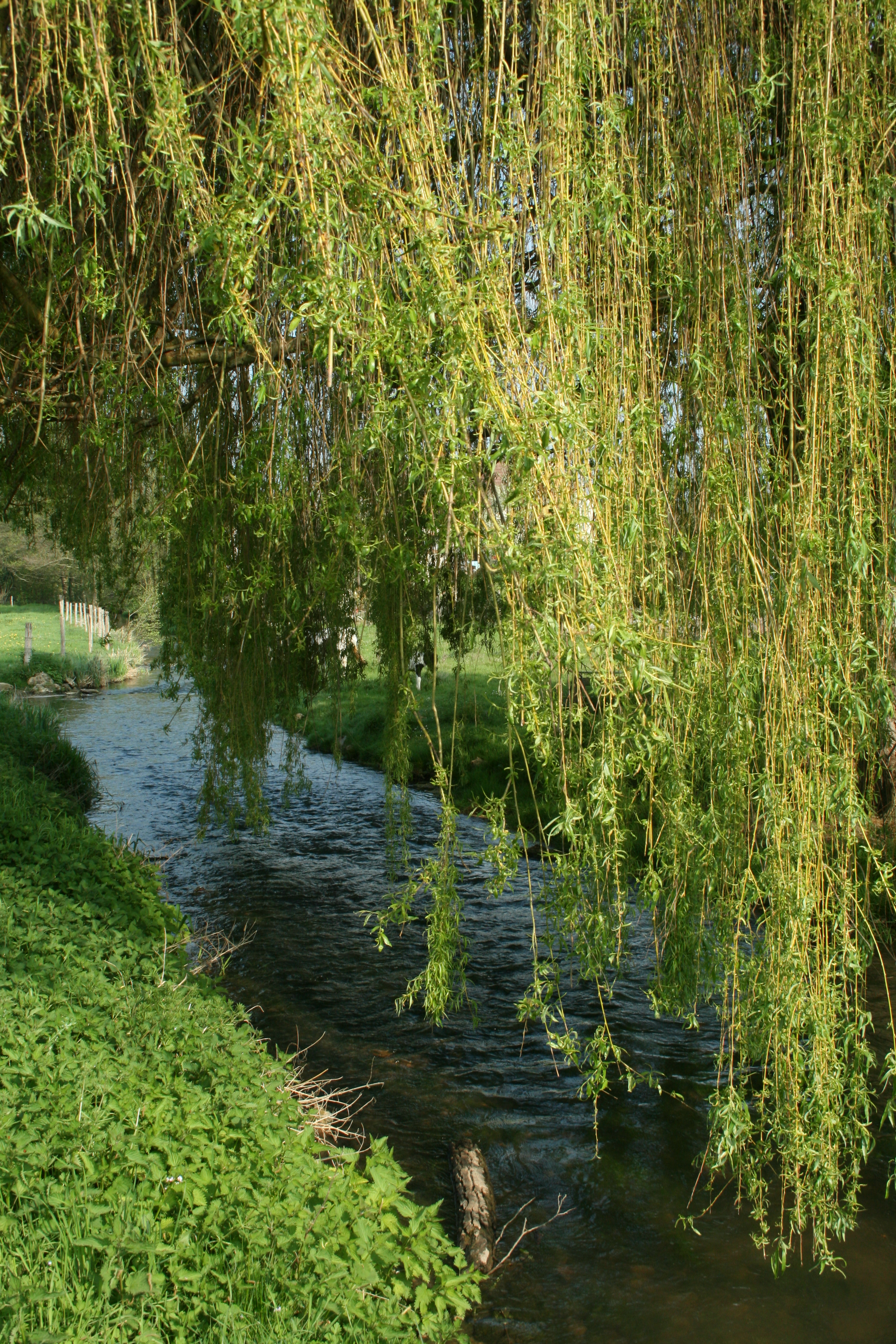

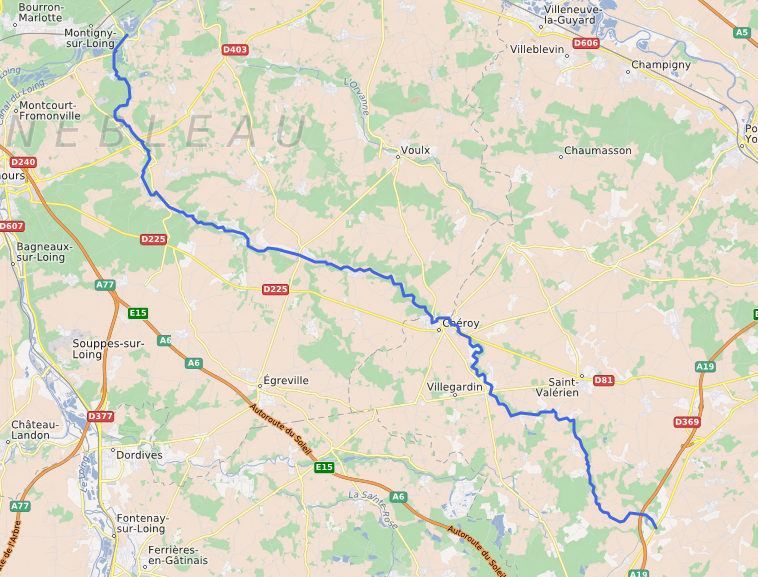

Location
- Country: France

Physical characteristics
- Source
  - location: near Égriselles-le-Bocage
  - coordinates: 48°06′38″N 3°08′45″E
  - elevation: 185 m (607 ft)
- Mouth
  - location: Loing
  - coordinates: 48°20′09″N 2°46′56″E
  - elevation: 50 m (160 ft)
- Length: 51.4 km (31.9 mi)

Basin features
- Progression: Loing→ Seine→ English Channel

The Lunain (French pronunciation: [lynɛ̃]) is a 51.4-kilometre-long (31.9 mi) river in the Yonne and Seine-et-Marne departments in north-central France. It is a right tributary of the Loing. Its source is in Yonne, less than 3 km (1.9 mi) south-west of Égriselles-le-Bocage. It joins the Loing at Épisy in Seine-et-Marne.

== Départements and communes it runs through ==
- Yonne: Égriselles-le-Bocage, Courtoin, La Belliole, Montacher-Villegardin, Chéroy
- Seine-et-Marne: Vaux-sur-Lunain, Lorrez-le-Bocage-Préaux, Paley, Nanteau-sur-Lunain, Treuzy-Levelay, Nonville, La Genevraye, Villemer, Épisy
