= Moret-Loing-et-Orvanne =

- Commune
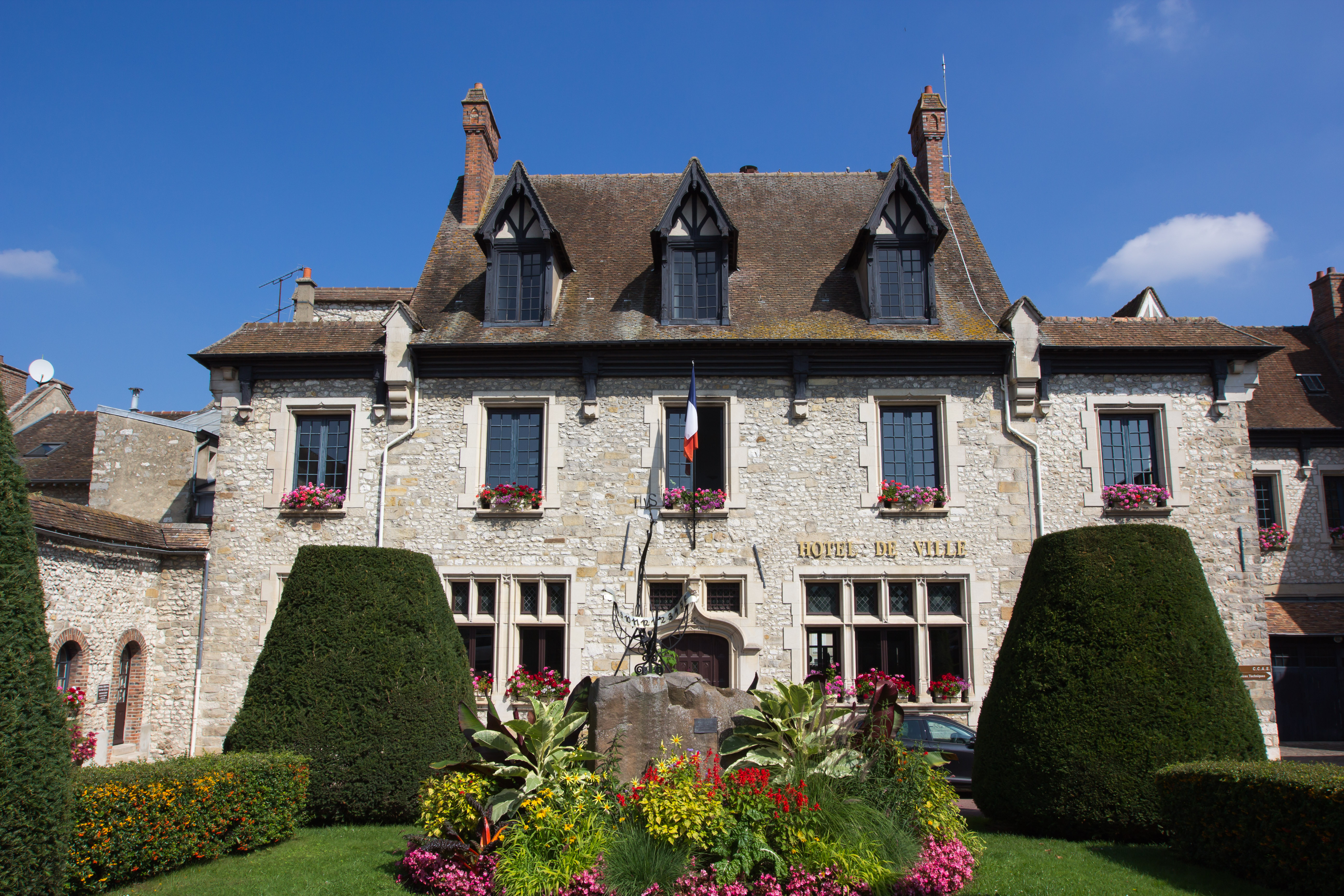
- The town hall in Moret-Loing-et-Orvanne
- Location of Moret-Loing-et-Orvanne
- Location within France Location within Île-de-France (region)
- Coordinates: 48°22′28″N 2°48′54″E
- Country: France
- Region: Île-de-France
- Department: Seine-et-Marne
- Arrondissement: Fontainebleau
- Canton: Montereau-Fault-Yonne
- Intercommunality: CC Moret Seine et Loing

Government
  - Mayor (2020–2026): Dikran Zakeossian
- Area^{1}: 33.40 km^{2} (12.90 sq mi)
- Highest elevation: 107 m (351 ft)
- Lowest elevation: 45 m (148 ft)
- Population (2023): 12,810
  - Density: 383.5/km^{2} (993.3/sq mi)
- Time zone: UTC+01:00 (CET)
  - Summer (DST): UTC+02:00 (CEST)
- INSEE/Postal code: 77316 /77250
- ^{1} French Land Register data, which excludes lakes, ponds, glaciers > 1 km^{2} (0.386 sq mi or 247 acres) and river estuaries.

Moret-Loing-et-Orvanne (French pronunciation: [mɔʁɛ lwɛ̃ e ɔʁvan]) is a commune in the Seine-et-Marne department, in the Île-de-France region in north-central France. Moret-sur-Loing is the municipal seat. The municipality was established on 1 January 2016 and consists of the former communes of Épisy, Montarlot and Orvanne. Orvanne was the result of the merger of the communes of Moret-sur-Loing and Écuelles on 1 January 2015. On 1 January 2017, the former commune of Veneux-les-Sablons was merged into Moret-Loing-et-Orvanne.

== Population ==
Populations of the area corresponding with the commune of Moret-Loing-et-Orvanne at 1 January 2025.

Historical population
Year	Pop.	±% p.a.
1968	7,969	—
1975	8,666	+1.21%
1982	9,502	+1.32%
1990	10,960	+1.80%
1999	12,200	+1.20%
2007	12,466	+0.27%
2012	12,369	−0.16%
2017	12,214	−0.25%
2023	12,810	+0.80%
Source: INSEE

== See also ==
- Communes of the Seine-et-Marne department
