= Nanteau-sur-Lunain =

- Commune
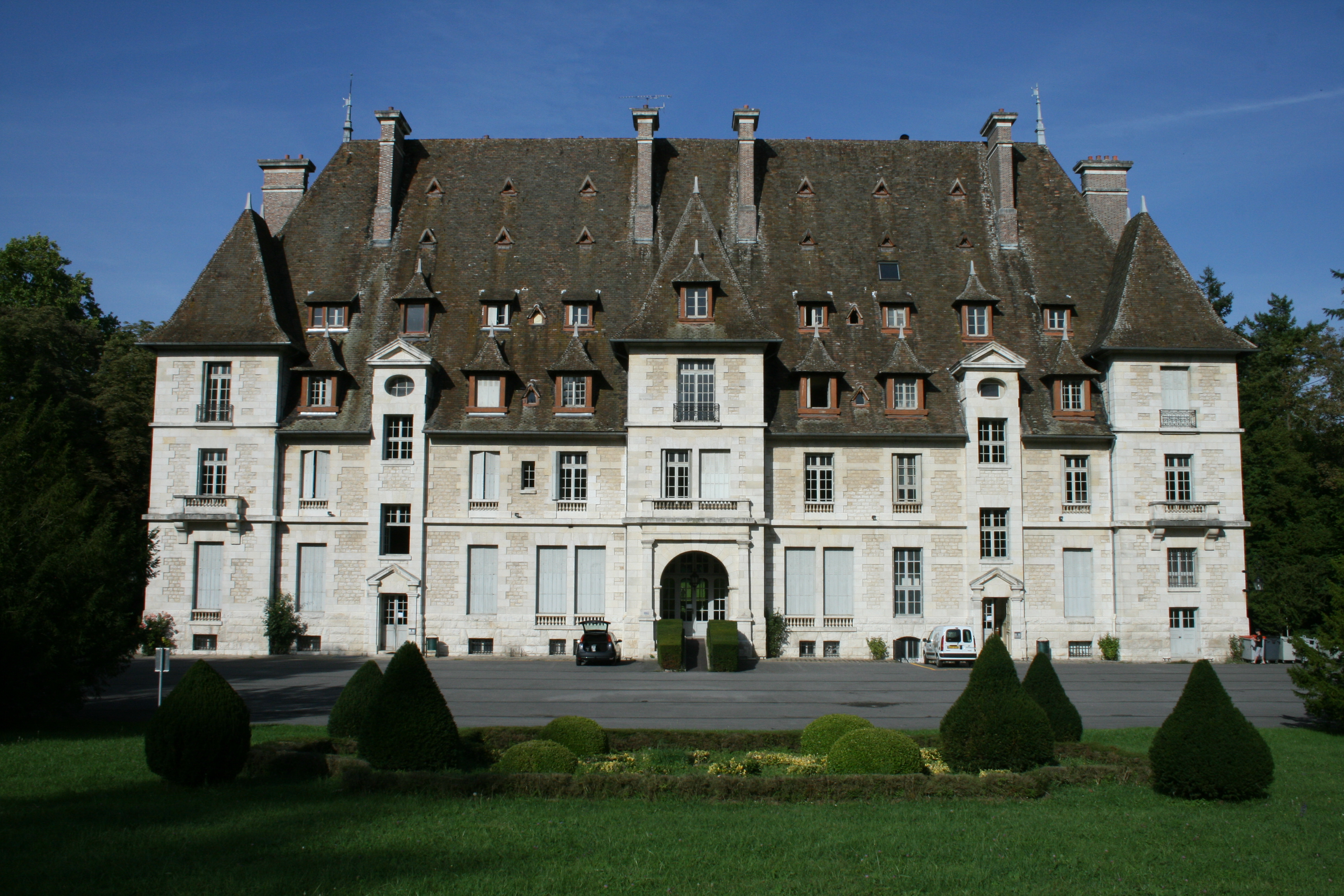
- The chateau in Nanteau-sur-Lunain
- Location of Nanteau-sur-Lunain
- Location within France Location within Île-de-France (region)
- Coordinates: 48°15′27″N 2°48′33″E
- Country: France
- Region: Île-de-France
- Department: Seine-et-Marne
- Arrondissement: Fontainebleau
- Canton: Nemours
- Intercommunality: CC Moret Seine et Loing

Government
  - Mayor (2020–2026): Jean-François Guimard
- Area^{1}: 13.25 km^{2} (5.12 sq mi)
- Highest elevation: 146 m (479 ft)
- Lowest elevation: 71 m (233 ft)
- Population (2023): 702
  - Density: 53.0/km^{2} (137/sq mi)
- Time zone: UTC+01:00 (CET)
  - Summer (DST): UTC+02:00 (CEST)
- INSEE/Postal code: 77329 /77710
- ^{1} French Land Register data, which excludes lakes, ponds, glaciers > 1 km^{2} (0.386 sq mi or 247 acres) and river estuaries.

Nanteau-sur-Lunain (French pronunciation: [nɑ̃to syʁ lynɛ̃], literally Nanteau on Lunain) is a commune in the Seine-et-Marne department in the Île-de-France region in north-central France.

== Geography ==
The commune is traversed by the Lunain river.

== Demographics ==
Inhabitants are called Nantelliens.

== See also ==
- Communes of the Seine-et-Marne department
