= Paley, Seine-et-Marne =

Paley
- Commune
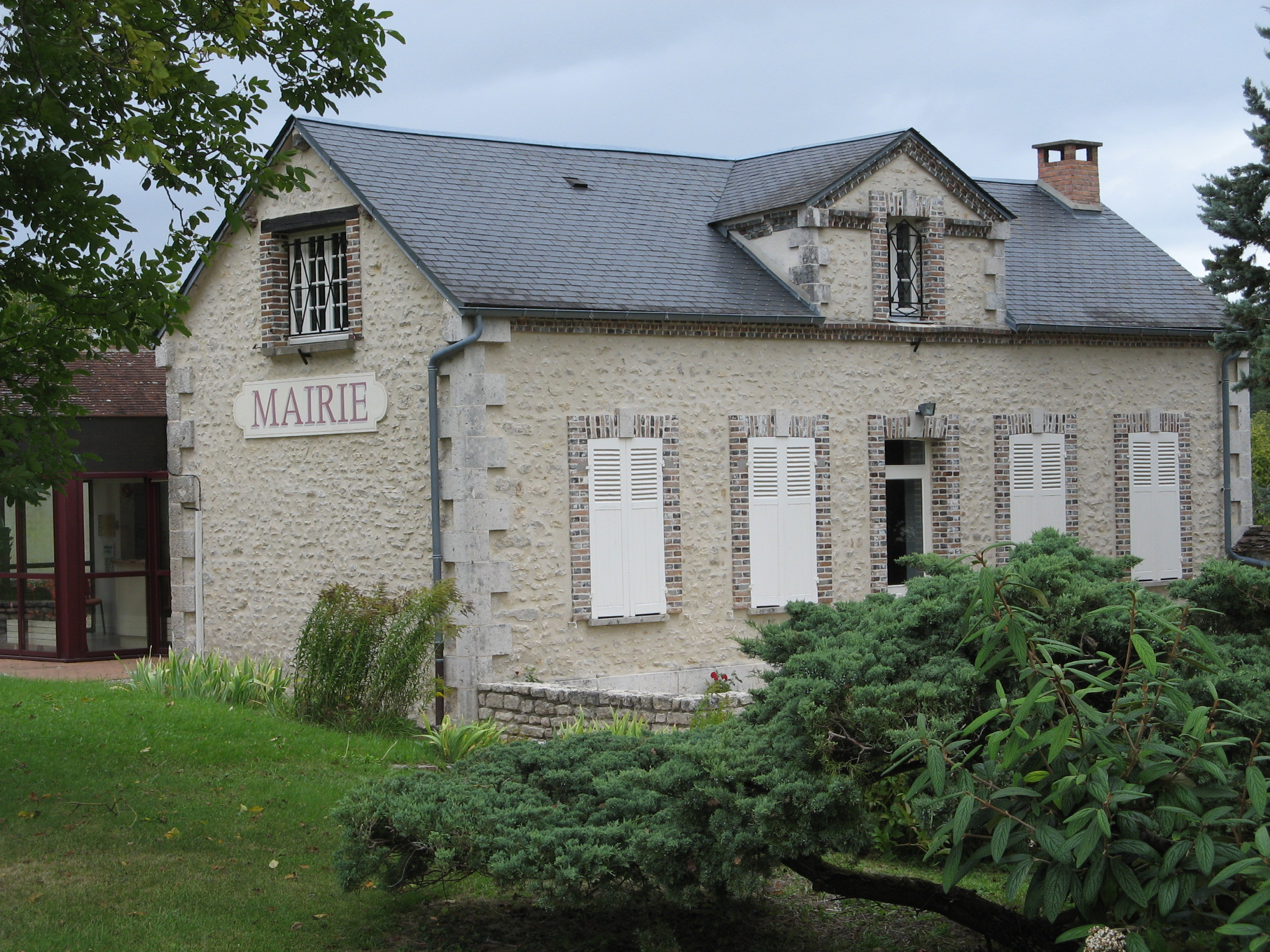
- The town hall in Paley
- Location of Paley
- Location within France Location within Île-de-France (region)
- Coordinates: 48°14′33″N 2°51′37″E
- Country: France
- Region: Île-de-France
- Department: Seine-et-Marne
- Arrondissement: Fontainebleau
- Canton: Nemours
- Intercommunality: CC Moret Seine et Loing

Government
  - Mayor (2020–2026): Michel Cochin
- Area^{1}: 9.26 km^{2} (3.58 sq mi)
- Highest elevation: 141 m (463 ft)
- Lowest elevation: 80 m (260 ft)
- Population (2023): 483
  - Density: 52.2/km^{2} (135/sq mi)
- Time zone: UTC+01:00 (CET)
  - Summer (DST): UTC+02:00 (CEST)
- INSEE/Postal code: 77353 /77710
- ^{1} French Land Register data, which excludes lakes, ponds, glaciers > 1 km^{2} (0.386 sq mi or 247 acres) and river estuaries.

Paley (French pronunciation: [palɛ]) is a commune situated in the Seine-et-Marne department in the Île-de-France region in north-central France.

== Geography ==
The commune is traversed by the Lunain river.

== Demographics ==
Inhabitants are called Paleysiens.

== See also ==
- Communes of the Seine-et-Marne department
