= Saint-Ange-le-Viel =

- Part of Villemaréchal
- Location of Saint-Ange-le-Viel
- Location within France Location within Île-de-France (region)
- Coordinates: 48°15′58″N 2°54′07″E
- Country: France
- Region: Île-de-France
- Department: Seine-et-Marne
- Arrondissement: Fontainebleau
- Canton: Nemours
- Commune: Villemaréchal
- Area^{1}: 3.23 km^{2} (1.25 sq mi)
- Highest elevation: 143 m (469 ft)
- Lowest elevation: 92 m (302 ft)
- Population (2022): 230
  - Density: 71/km^{2} (180/sq mi)
- Time zone: UTC+01:00 (CET)
  - Summer (DST): UTC+02:00 (CEST)
- Postal code: 77710
- ^{1} French Land Register data, which excludes lakes, ponds, glaciers > 1 km^{2} (0.386 sq mi or 247 acres) and river estuaries.

Saint-Ange-le-Viel is a former commune in the Seine-et-Marne department in the Île-de-France region in north-central France. On 1 January 2019, it was merged into the commune Villemaréchal. Inhabitants of Saint-Ange-le-Viel are called Saintangevins.

== See also ==
- Communes of the Seine-et-Marne department
