= Château de Moret =

Castle in Moret-sur-Loing in the Seine-et-Marne département of France

Coordinates: 48°22′15″N 2°49′8″E

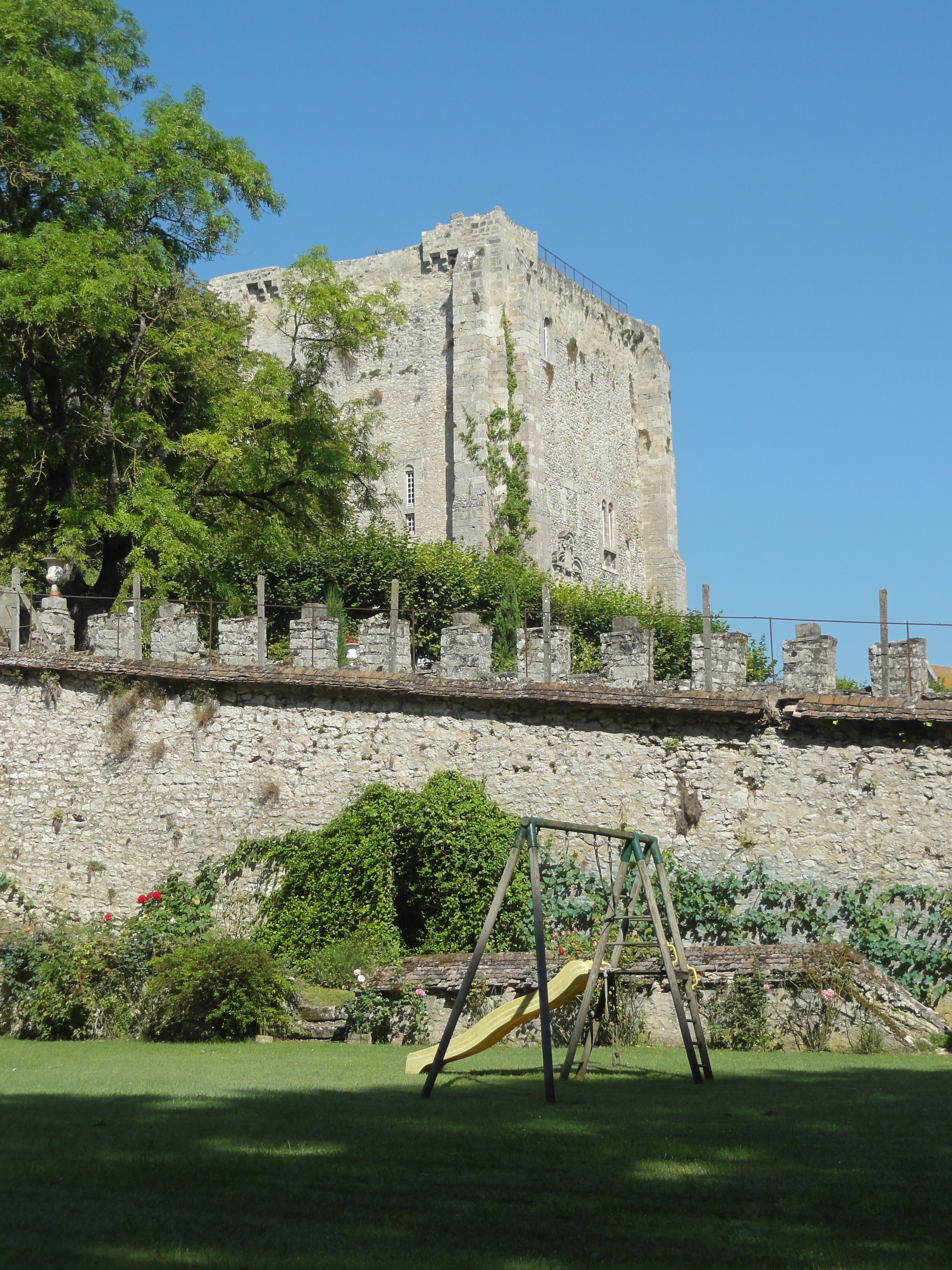
Château de Moret keep

The Château de Moret is a castle in the commune of Moret-sur-Loing in the Seine-et-Marne département of France.

Originally built in the 12th century, it was substantially altered in the 17th century.

The castle sits on the edge of the plateau and its secondary defences slope down to the river. The town was built at the head of the bridge and on the slopes of the castle hillock. Its rectangular keep with buttresses dates back to Louis VII.

Privately owned, it has been listed since 1926 as a monument historique by the French Ministry of Culture. It is not open to the public.

== See also ==
- List of castles in France
