= Château d'Argeville =

Coordinates: 48.3898°N 2.8535°E

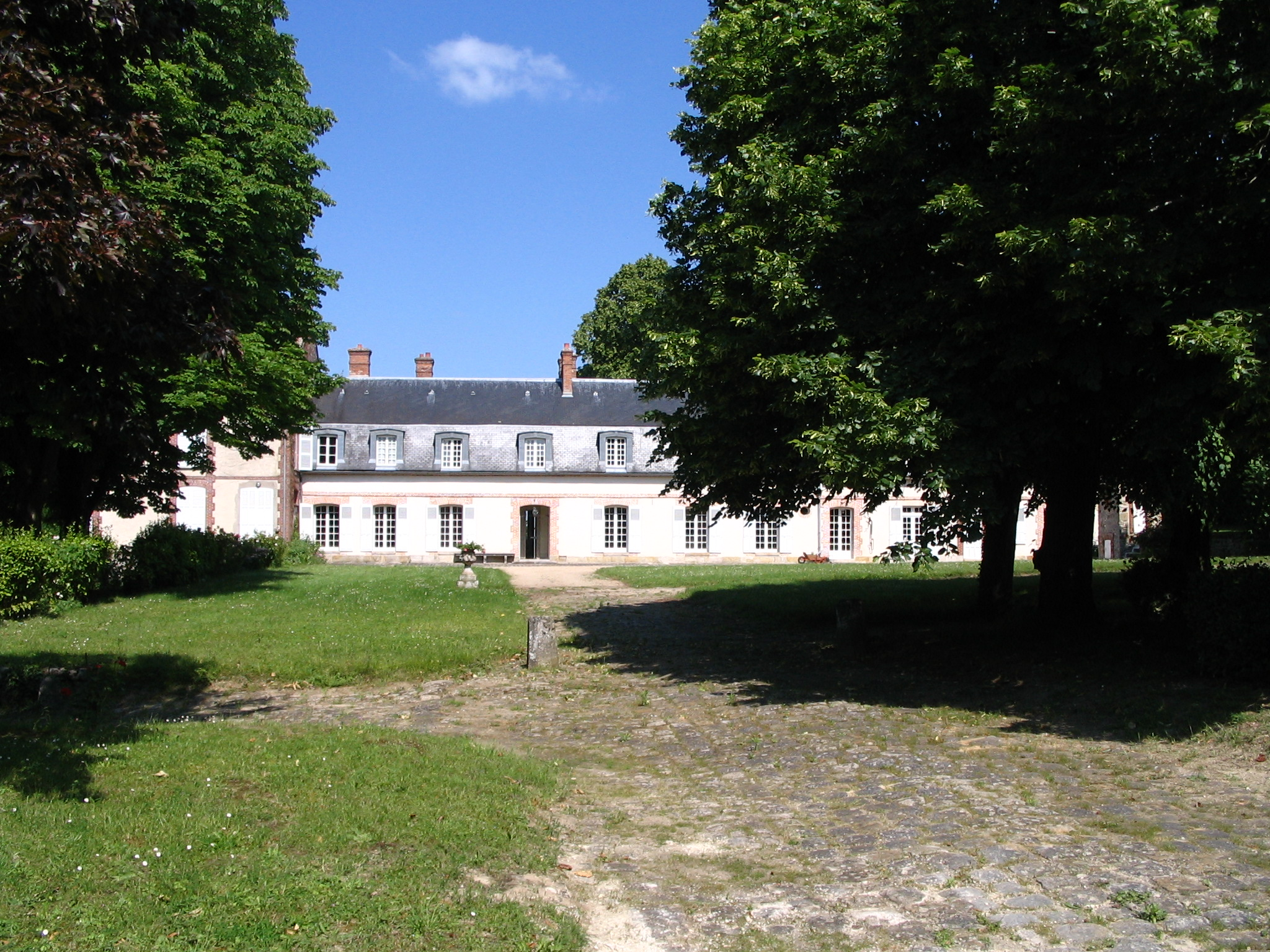
Château d'Argeville

The Château d'Argeville is a château in the commune of Vernou-la-Celle-sur-Seine, Seine-et-Marne, France. Some elements of the château date from the 17th century, and those and parts of its grounds are listed as a monument historique by the French Ministry of Culture. The château itself, being partially destroyed, is not protected.

Around 1700, the château had French gardens with hedged squares and crescents.

The château was occupied during the last decades of his life by the exiled English politician Lord Bolingbroke (1678–1751), who wrote many of his works there.

Joseph Charles Hippolyte Crosse (1826–1898), the French conchologist, lived in the château until his death there on 7 August 1898.
