= Veneux-les-Sablons =

- Part of Moret-Loing-et-Orvanne
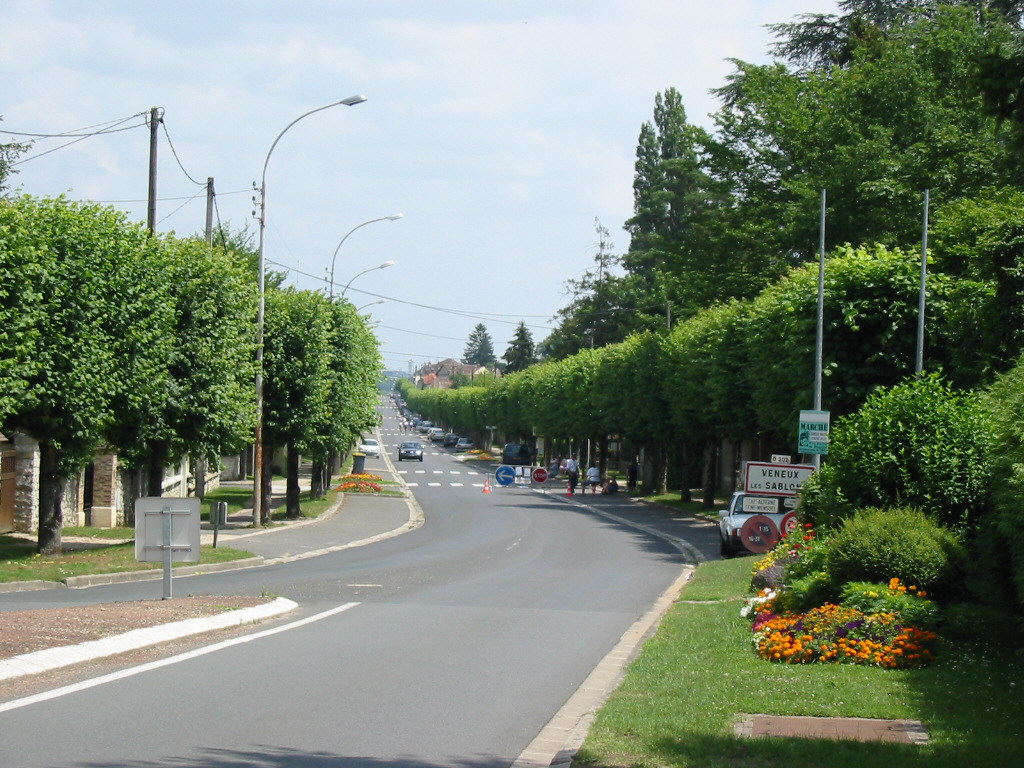
- Porte Nadon
- Location of Veneux-les-Sablons
- Location within France Location within Île-de-France (region)
- Coordinates: 48°22′34″N 2°47′59″E
- Country: France
- Region: Île-de-France
- Department: Seine-et-Marne
- Arrondissement: Fontainebleau
- Canton: Montereau-Fault-Yonne
- Commune: Moret-Loing-et-Orvanne
- Area^{1}: 4.03 km^{2} (1.56 sq mi)
- Highest elevation: 93 m (305 ft)
- Lowest elevation: 42 m (138 ft)
- Population (2022): 5,247
  - Density: 1,300/km^{2} (3,370/sq mi)
- Time zone: UTC+01:00 (CET)
  - Summer (DST): UTC+02:00 (CEST)
- Postal code: 77250
- ^{1} French Land Register data, which excludes lakes, ponds, glaciers > 1 km^{2} (0.386 sq mi or 247 acres) and river estuaries.

Veneux-les-Sablons (French pronunciation: [vənø le sablɔ̃]) is a former commune in the Seine-et-Marne department in the Ile-de-France region in north-central France. On 1 January 2017, it was merged into the commune Moret-Loing-et-Orvanne.

It is located near Moret-sur-Loing. Moret–Veneux-les-Sablons station has rail connections to Montargis, Melun, Montereau-Fault-Yonne, Laroche-Migennes and Paris.

== Demographics ==
Inhabitants of Veneux-les-Sablons are known as Veneusiens.

== Twin towns and sister cities ==
Veneux-les-Sablons is twinned with:

- Louny, Czech Republic, since 2004.
- Zschopau, Germany, since 2010.

== See also ==
- Communes of the Seine-et-Marne department
