= Chéroy =

- Commune
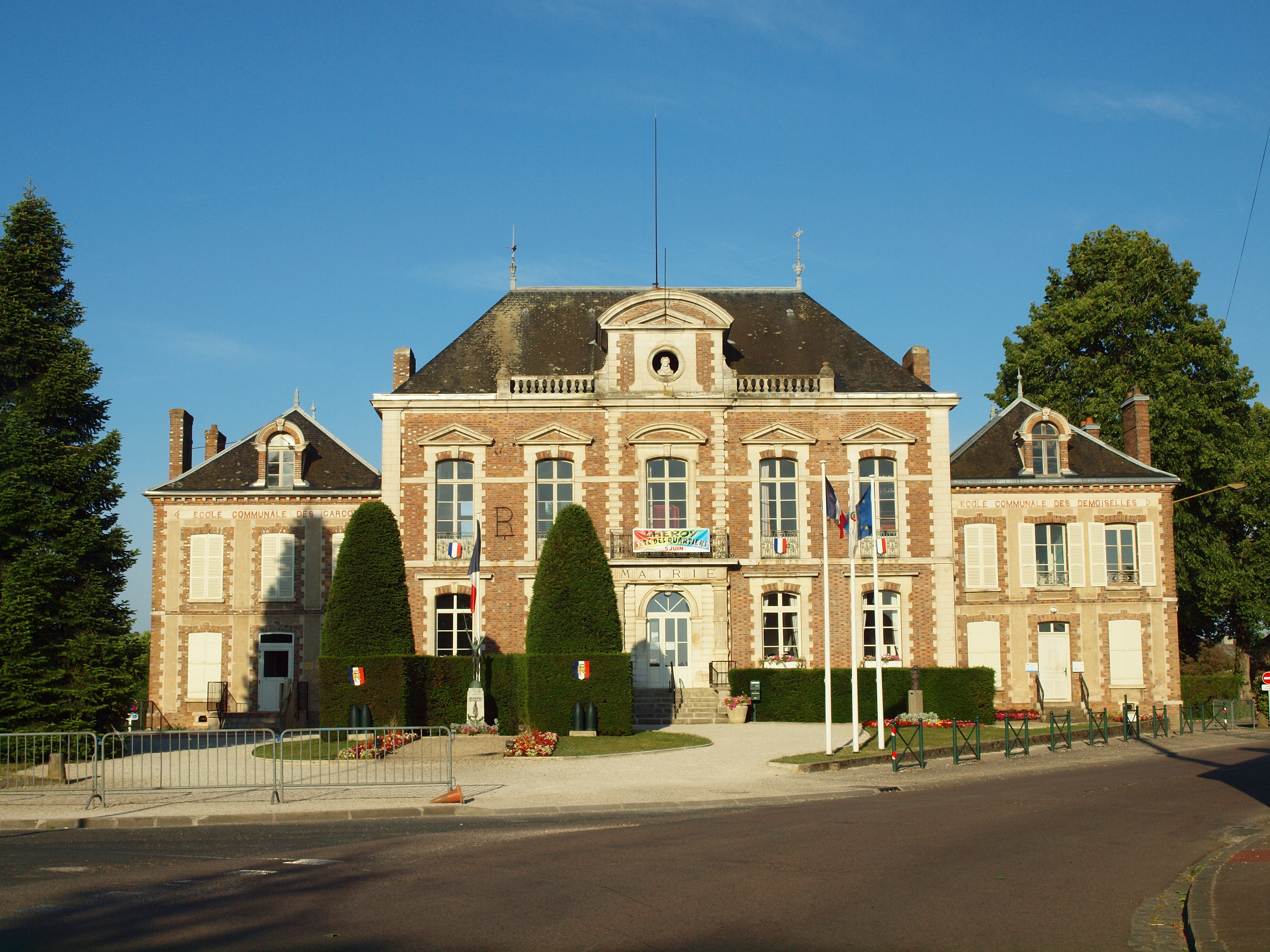
- The town hall in Chéroy

- Coat of arms
- Location of Chéroy
- Location within France Location within Bourgogne-Franche-Comté
- Coordinates: 48°12′07″N 2°59′56″E
- Country: France
- Region: Bourgogne-Franche-Comté
- Department: Yonne
- Arrondissement: Sens
- Canton: Gâtinais en Bourgogne

Government
  - Mayor (2020–2026): Brigitte Berteigne
- Area^{1}: 10.52 km^{2} (4.06 sq mi)
- Highest elevation: 159 m (522 ft)
- Lowest elevation: 123 m (404 ft)
- Population (2023): 1,760
  - Density: 167/km^{2} (433/sq mi)
- Time zone: UTC+01:00 (CET)
  - Summer (DST): UTC+02:00 (CEST)
- INSEE/Postal code: 89100 /89690
- ^{1} French Land Register data, which excludes lakes, ponds, glaciers > 1 km^{2} (0.386 sq mi or 247 acres) and river estuaries.

Chéroy (French pronunciation: [ʃeʁwa]) is a commune in the Yonne department in Bourgogne-Franche-Comté in north-central France.

== Geography ==
The river Lunain forms part of the commune's northern border.

== See also ==
- Communes of the Yonne department
