= Vernou-la-Celle-sur-Seine =

- Commune
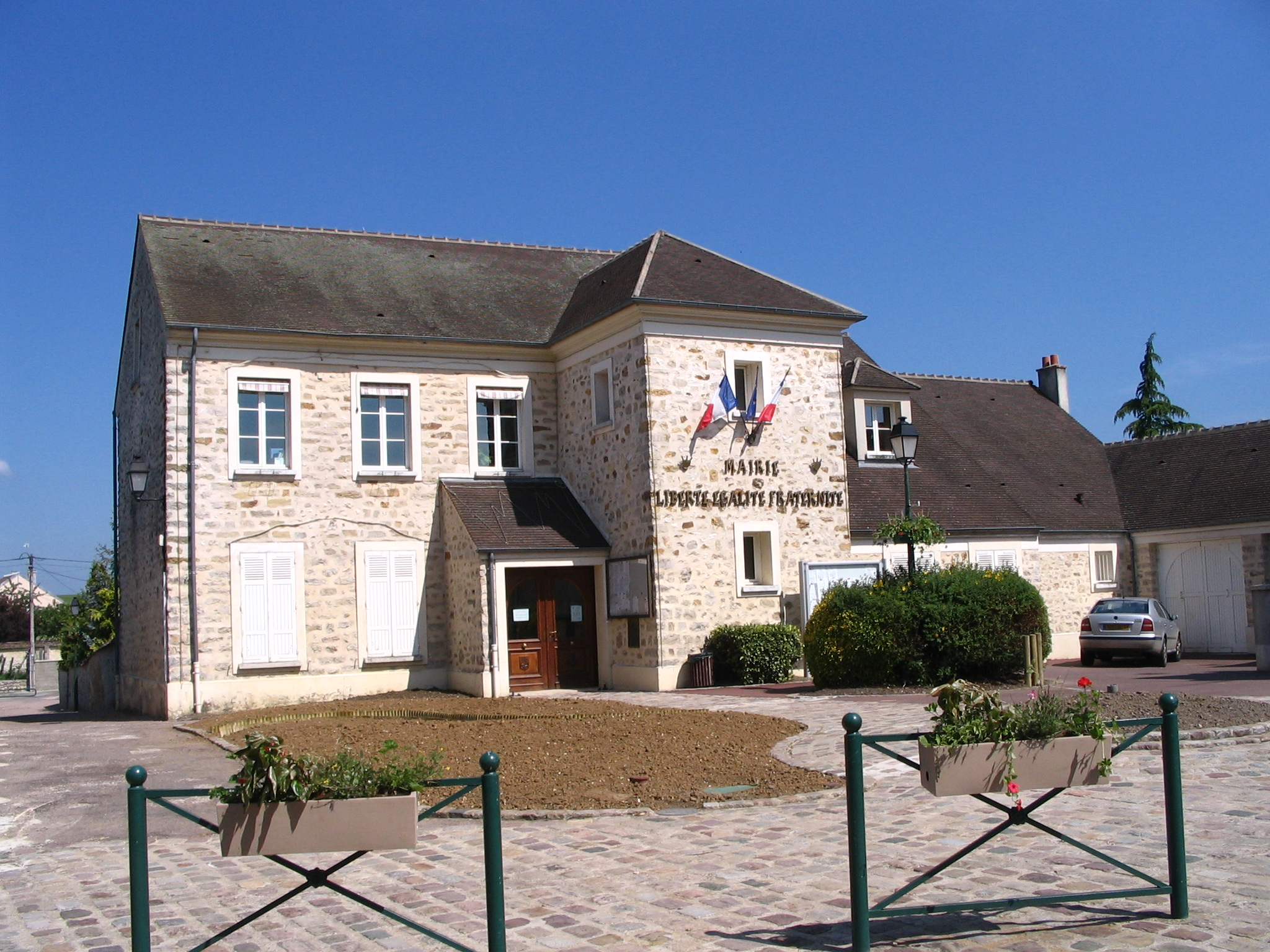
- The town hall in Vernou-la-Celle-sur-Seine
- Location of Vernou-la-Celle-sur-Seine
- Location within France Location within Île-de-France (region)
- Coordinates: 48°23′16″N 2°50′47″E
- Country: France
- Region: Île-de-France
- Department: Seine-et-Marne
- Arrondissement: Fontainebleau
- Canton: Montereau-Fault-Yonne
- Intercommunality: Moret Seine et Loing

Government
  - Mayor (2020–2026): Alain Momon
- Area^{1}: 22.42 km^{2} (8.66 sq mi)
- Highest elevation: 145 m (476 ft)
- Lowest elevation: 42 m (138 ft)
- Population (2023): 2,630
  - Density: 117/km^{2} (304/sq mi)
- Time zone: UTC+01:00 (CET)
  - Summer (DST): UTC+02:00 (CEST)
- INSEE/Postal code: 77494 /77670
- ^{1} French Land Register data, which excludes lakes, ponds, glaciers > 1 km^{2} (0.386 sq mi or 247 acres) and river estuaries.

Vernou-la-Celle-sur-Seine (French pronunciation: [vɛʁnu la sɛl syʁ sɛn]) is a commune in the Seine-et-Marne department in the Île-de-France region in north-central France.

Vernou-la-Celle-sur-Seine is the twin town to Manorbier, in Pembrokeshire, South West Wales, and was twinned in 1981.

== Population ==
Historical population
Year	Pop.	±% p.a.
1968	1,061	—
1975	1,172	+1.43%
1982	1,408	+2.66%
1990	2,260	+6.09%
1999	2,499	+1.12%
2007	2,673	+0.84%
2012	2,691	+0.13%
2017	2,673	−0.13%
2023	2,630	−0.27%
Source: INSEE

Inhabitants of Vernou-la-Celle-sur-Seine are called Vernoucellois in French.

== Buildings ==
The notable buildings of the commune include the Château d'Argeville.

== See also ==
- Communes of the Seine-et-Marne department
