= Villecerf =

- Commune
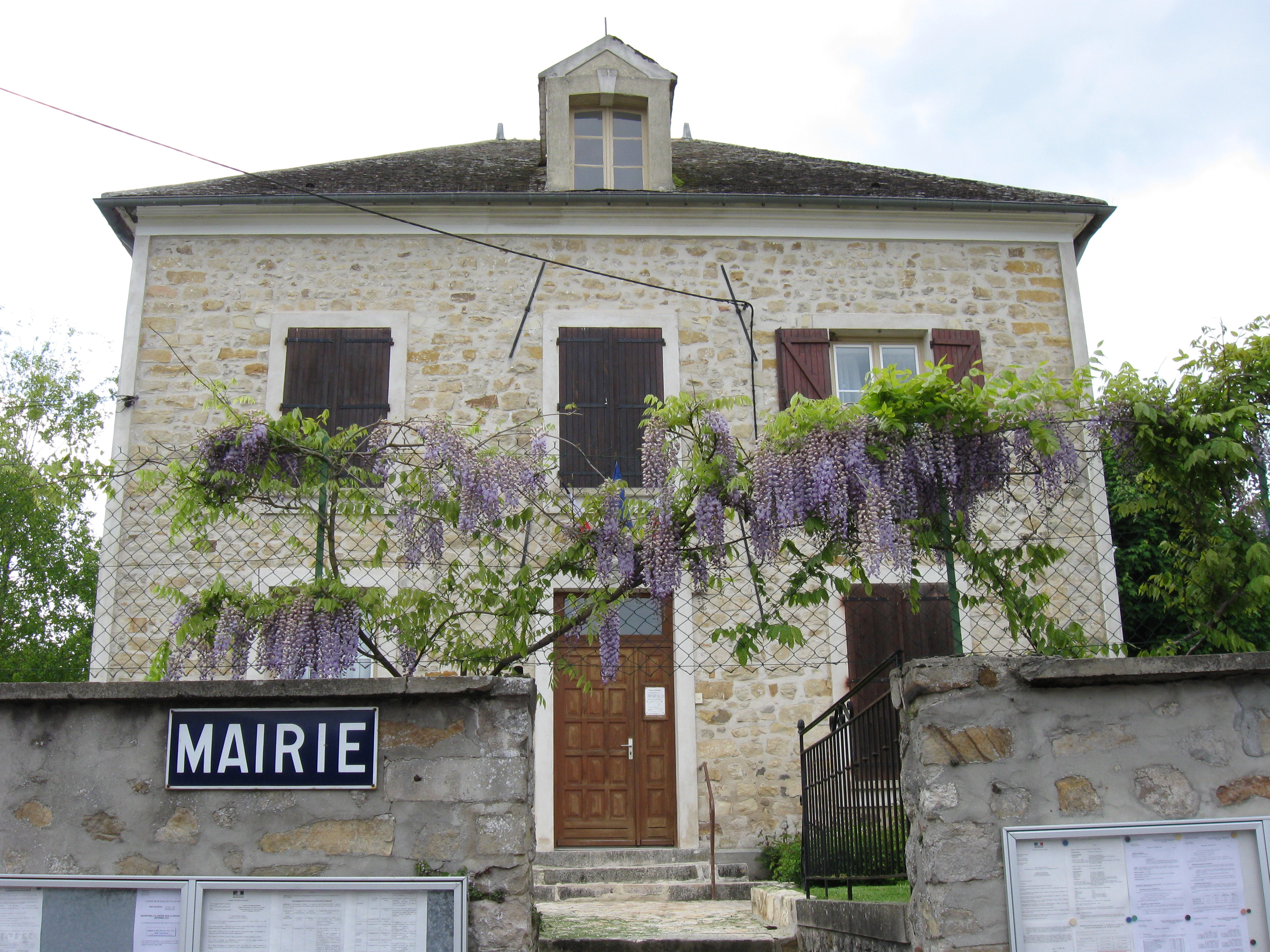
- The town hall in Villecerf
- Location of Villecerf
- Location within France Location within Île-de-France (region)
- Coordinates: 48°19′38″N 2°50′51″E
- Country: France
- Region: Île-de-France
- Department: Seine-et-Marne
- Arrondissement: Fontainebleau
- Canton: Montereau-Fault-Yonne
- Intercommunality: Moret Seine et Loing

Government
  - Mayor (2020–2026): François Deysson
- Area^{1}: 10.94 km^{2} (4.22 sq mi)
- Highest elevation: 139 m (456 ft)
- Lowest elevation: 60 m (200 ft)
- Population (2023): 724
  - Density: 66.2/km^{2} (171/sq mi)
- Time zone: UTC+01:00 (CET)
  - Summer (DST): UTC+02:00 (CEST)
- INSEE/Postal code: 77501 /77250
- ^{1} French Land Register data, which excludes lakes, ponds, glaciers > 1 km^{2} (0.386 sq mi or 247 acres) and river estuaries.

Villecerf (French pronunciation: [vilsɛʁ(f)]) is a commune in the Seine-et-Marne department in the Île-de-France region in north-central France.

== Demographics ==
Inhabitants of Villecerf are called Villecerfois.

== See also ==
- Communes of the Seine-et-Marne department
