= Montarlot =

- Part of Moret-Loing-et-Orvanne
- Location of Montarlot
- Location within France Location within Île-de-France (region)
- Coordinates: 48°21′00″N 2°51′00″E
- Country: France
- Region: Île-de-France
- Department: Seine-et-Marne
- Arrondissement: Fontainebleau
- Canton: Montereau-Fault-Yonne
- Commune: Moret-Loing-et-Orvanne
- Area^{1}: 5.21 km^{2} (2.01 sq mi)
- Highest elevation: 107 m (351 ft)
- Lowest elevation: 55 m (180 ft)
- Population (2022): 232
  - Density: 44.5/km^{2} (115/sq mi)
- Time zone: UTC+01:00 (CET)
  - Summer (DST): UTC+02:00 (CEST)
- Postal code: 77250
- ^{1} French Land Register data, which excludes lakes, ponds, glaciers > 1 km^{2} (0.386 sq mi or 247 acres) and river estuaries.

Montarlot (French pronunciation: [mɔ̃taʁlo]) is a former commune in the Seine-et-Marne department in the Île-de-France region in north-central France. On 1 January 2016 it was merged into the new commune of Moret-Loing-et-Orvanne.

== See also ==
- Communes of the Seine-et-Marne department
