= Épisy =

- Part of Moret-Loing-et-Orvanne
- Location of Épisy
- Location within France Location within Île-de-France (region)
- Coordinates: 48°20′00″N 2°47′15″E
- Country: France
- Region: Île-de-France
- Department: Seine-et-Marne
- Arrondissement: Fontainebleau
- Canton: Montereau-Fault-Yonne
- Commune: Moret-Loing-et-Orvanne
- Area^{1}: 7.41 km^{2} (2.86 sq mi)
- Highest elevation: 96 m (315 ft)
- Lowest elevation: 50 m (160 ft)
- Population (2022): 608
  - Density: 82.1/km^{2} (213/sq mi)
- Time zone: UTC+01:00 (CET)
  - Summer (DST): UTC+02:00 (CEST)
- Postal code: 77250
- ^{1} French Land Register data, which excludes lakes, ponds, glaciers > 1 km^{2} (0.386 sq mi or 247 acres) and river estuaries.

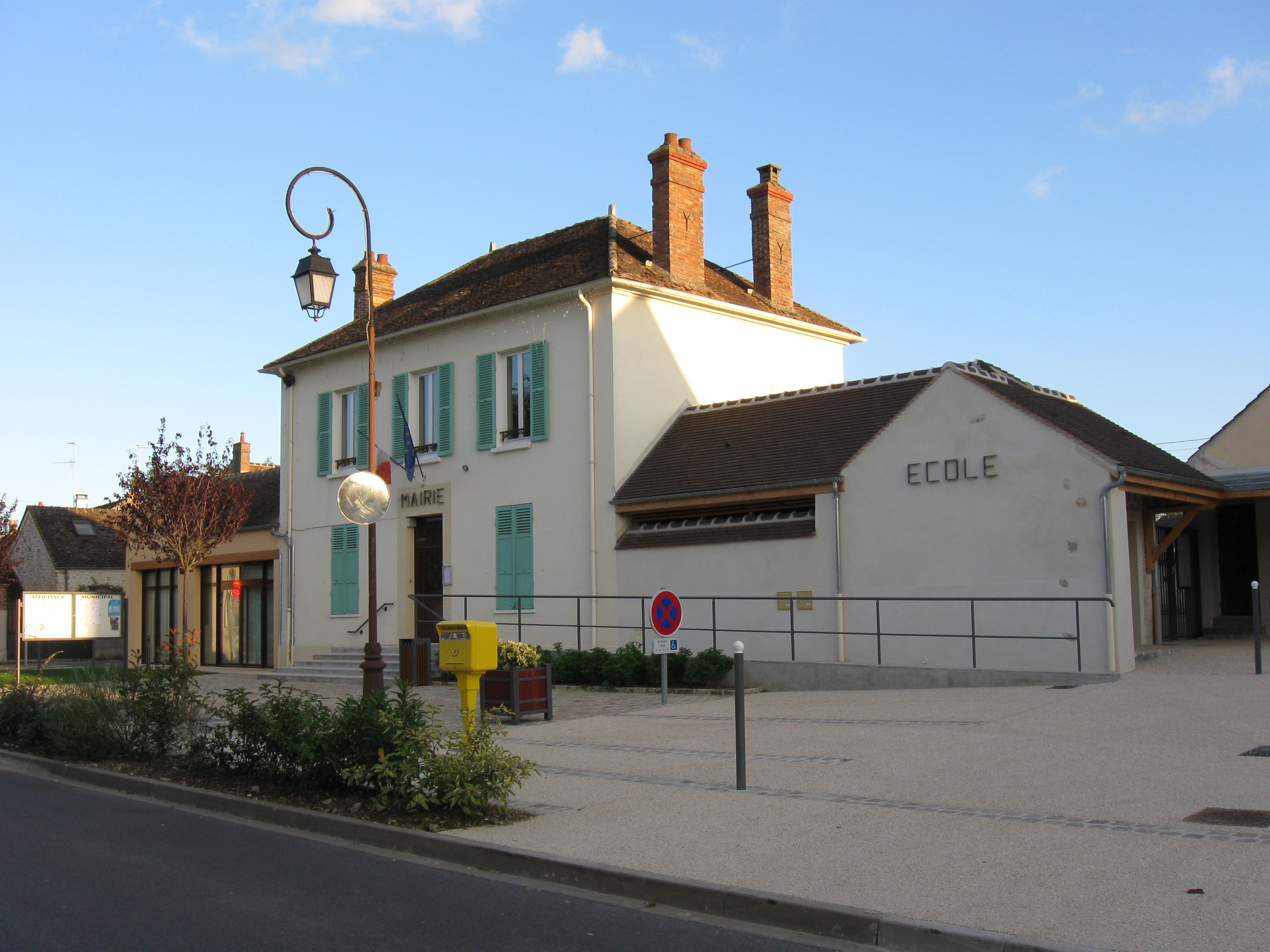
Town Hall-School of Épisy

Épisy (French pronunciation: [epizi]) is a former commune in the Seine-et-Marne department in the Île-de-France region in north-central France. On 1 January 2016, it was merged into the new commune Moret-Loing-et-Orvanne. Inhabitants of Épisy are called Épisiens.

== Geography ==
The river Lunain flows into the Loing in the commune.

== See also ==
- Communes of the Seine-et-Marne department
