= Écuelles, Seine-et-Marne =

Écuelles
- Part of Moret-Loing-et-Orvanne
- Location of Écuelles
- Location within France Location within Île-de-France (region)
- Coordinates: 48°21′09″N 2°49′18″E
- Country: France
- Region: Île-de-France
- Department: Seine-et-Marne
- Arrondissement: Fontainebleau
- Canton: Moret-sur-Loing
- Commune: Moret-Loing-et-Orvanne
- Area^{1}: 11.81 km^{2} (4.56 sq mi)
- Highest elevation: 103 m (338 ft)
- Lowest elevation: 45 m (148 ft)
- Population (2022): 2,320
  - Density: 196/km^{2} (509/sq mi)
- Time zone: UTC+01:00 (CET)
  - Summer (DST): UTC+02:00 (CEST)
- Postal code: 77250
- ^{1} French Land Register data, which excludes lakes, ponds, glaciers > 1 km^{2} (0.386 sq mi or 247 acres) and river estuaries.

Écuelles (French pronunciation: [ekɥɛl]) is a former commune in the Seine-et-Marne department in the Île-de-France region in north-central France.

On 1 January 2015, Écuelles and Moret-sur-Loing merged becoming one commune called Orvanne, which merged into the new commune Moret-Loing-et-Orvanne on 1 January 2016.

== Demographics ==
Inhabitants are called Écuellois.

== See also ==
- Communes of the Seine-et-Marne department
