= Nonville, Seine-et-Marne =

Nonville
- Commune
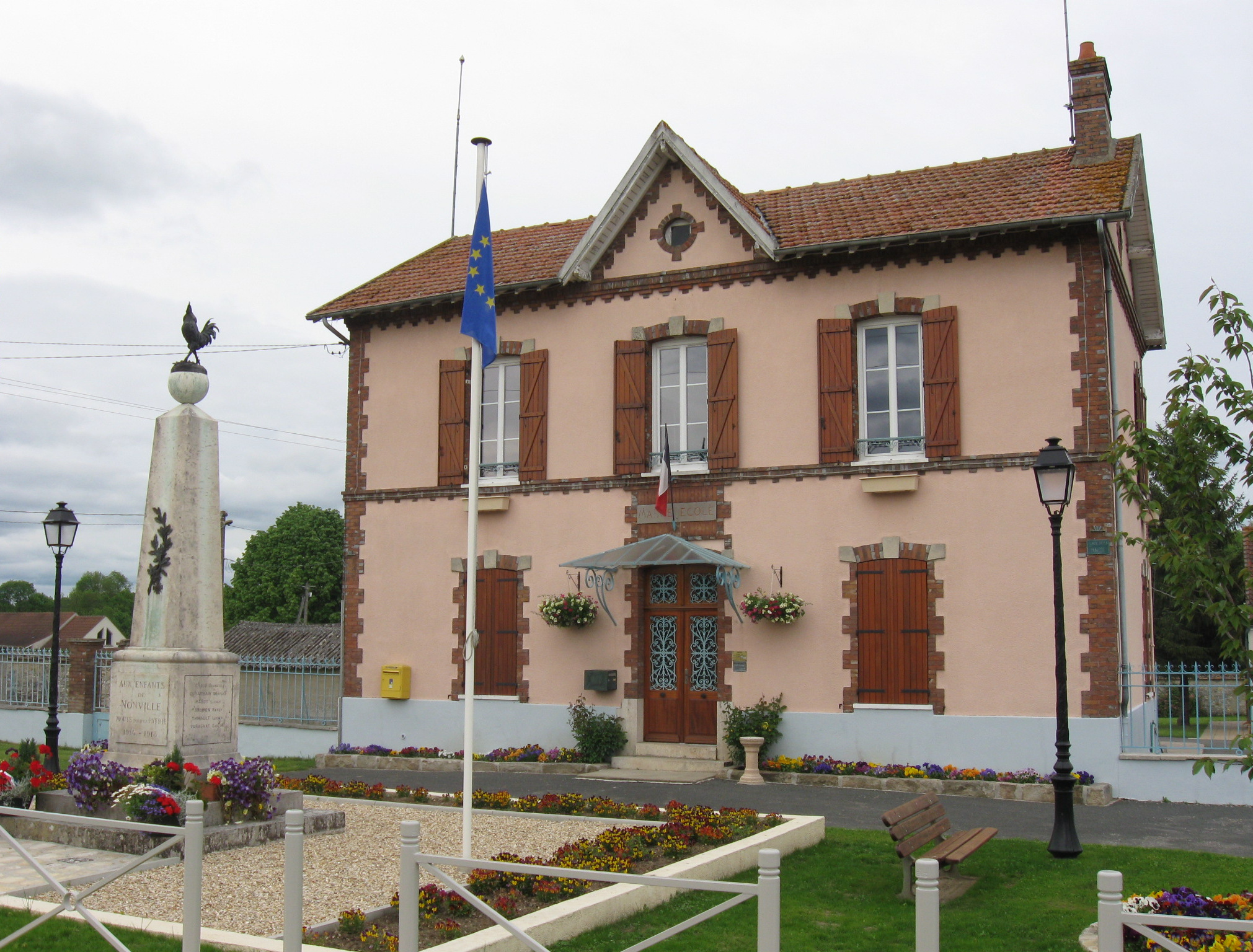
- The town hall in Nonville

- Coat of arms
- Location of Nonville
- Location within France Location within Île-de-France (region)
- Coordinates: 48°16′55″N 2°47′39″E
- Country: France
- Region: Île-de-France
- Department: Seine-et-Marne
- Arrondissement: Fontainebleau
- Canton: Nemours
- Intercommunality: CC Moret Seine et Loing

Government
  - Mayor (2022–2026): Jean Claude Belliot
- Area^{1}: 11.43 km^{2} (4.41 sq mi)
- Highest elevation: 100 m (330 ft)
- Lowest elevation: 57 m (187 ft)
- Population (2023): 591
  - Density: 51.7/km^{2} (134/sq mi)
- Time zone: UTC+01:00 (CET)
  - Summer (DST): UTC+02:00 (CEST)
- INSEE/Postal code: 77340 /77140
- ^{1} French Land Register data, which excludes lakes, ponds, glaciers > 1 km^{2} (0.386 sq mi or 247 acres) and river estuaries.

Nonville (French pronunciation: [nɔ̃vil]) is a commune in the Seine-et-Marne department in the Île-de-France region in north-central France.

== Geography ==
The commune is traversed by the Lunain river.

== Demographics ==
Inhabitants are called Nonvillois.

== See also ==
- Communes of the Seine-et-Marne department
