= Villemer, Seine-et-Marne =

Villemer
- Commune
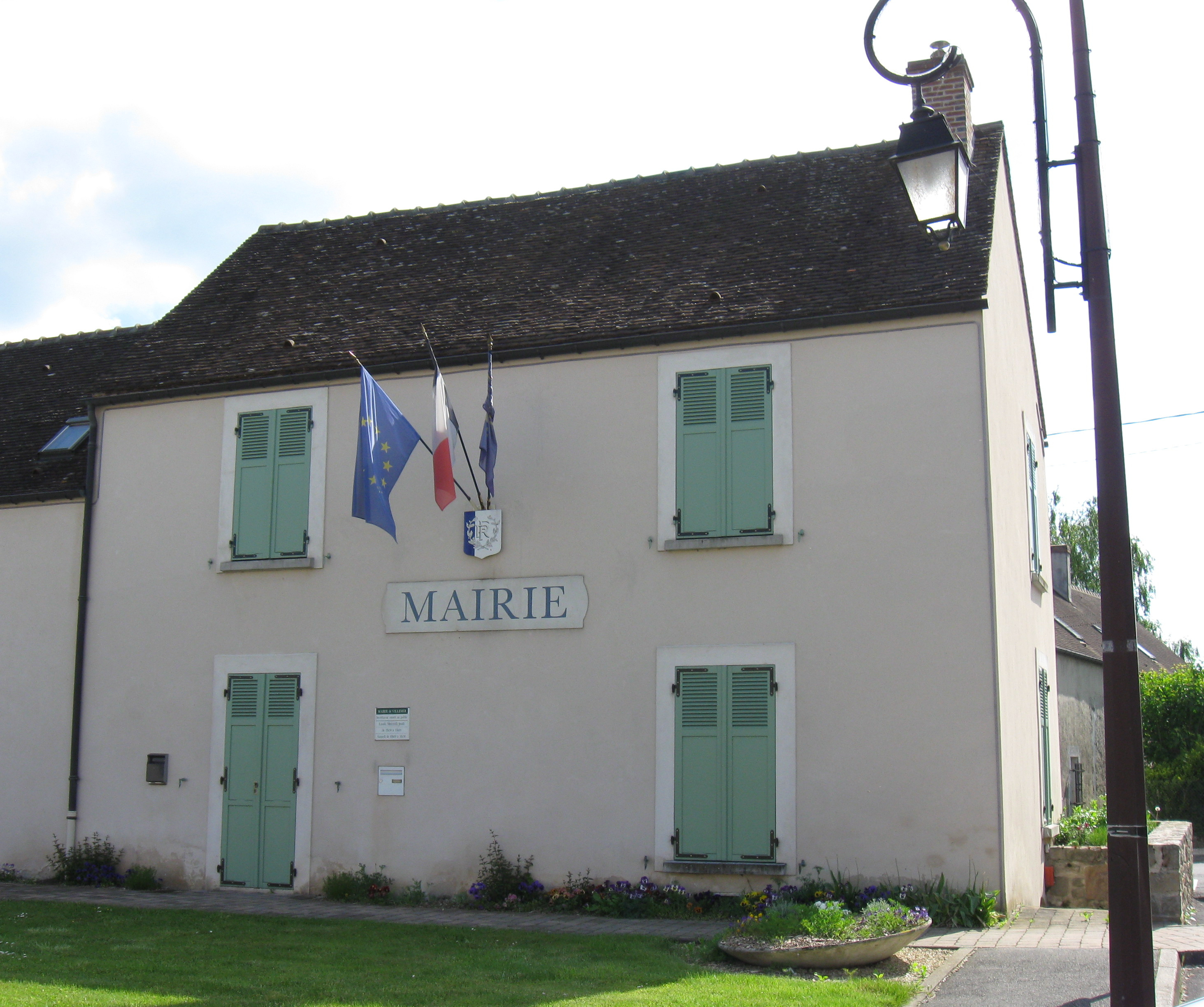
- The town hall in Villemer
- Location of Villemer
- Location within France Location within Île-de-France (region)
- Coordinates: 48°18′01″N 2°49′31″E
- Country: France
- Region: Île-de-France
- Department: Seine-et-Marne
- Arrondissement: Fontainebleau
- Canton: Nemours
- Intercommunality: Moret Seine et Loing

Government
  - Mayor (2020–2026): Franck Beaufreton
- Area^{1}: 18.54 km^{2} (7.16 sq mi)
- Highest elevation: 106 m (348 ft)
- Lowest elevation: 53 m (174 ft)
- Population (2023): 759
  - Density: 40.9/km^{2} (106/sq mi)
- Time zone: UTC+01:00 (CET)
  - Summer (DST): UTC+02:00 (CEST)
- INSEE/Postal code: 77506 /77250
- ^{1} French Land Register data, which excludes lakes, ponds, glaciers > 1 km^{2} (0.386 sq mi or 247 acres) and river estuaries.

Villemer (French pronunciation: [vilmɛʁ]) is a commune in the Seine-et-Marne department in the Île-de-France region in north-central France.

== Geography ==
The commune is traversed by the Lunain river.

== Demographics ==
Inhabitants of Villemer are called Villemériannaisois.

== See also ==
- Communes of the Seine-et-Marne department
