= Moret-sur-Loing =

- Part of Moret-Loing-et-Orvanne
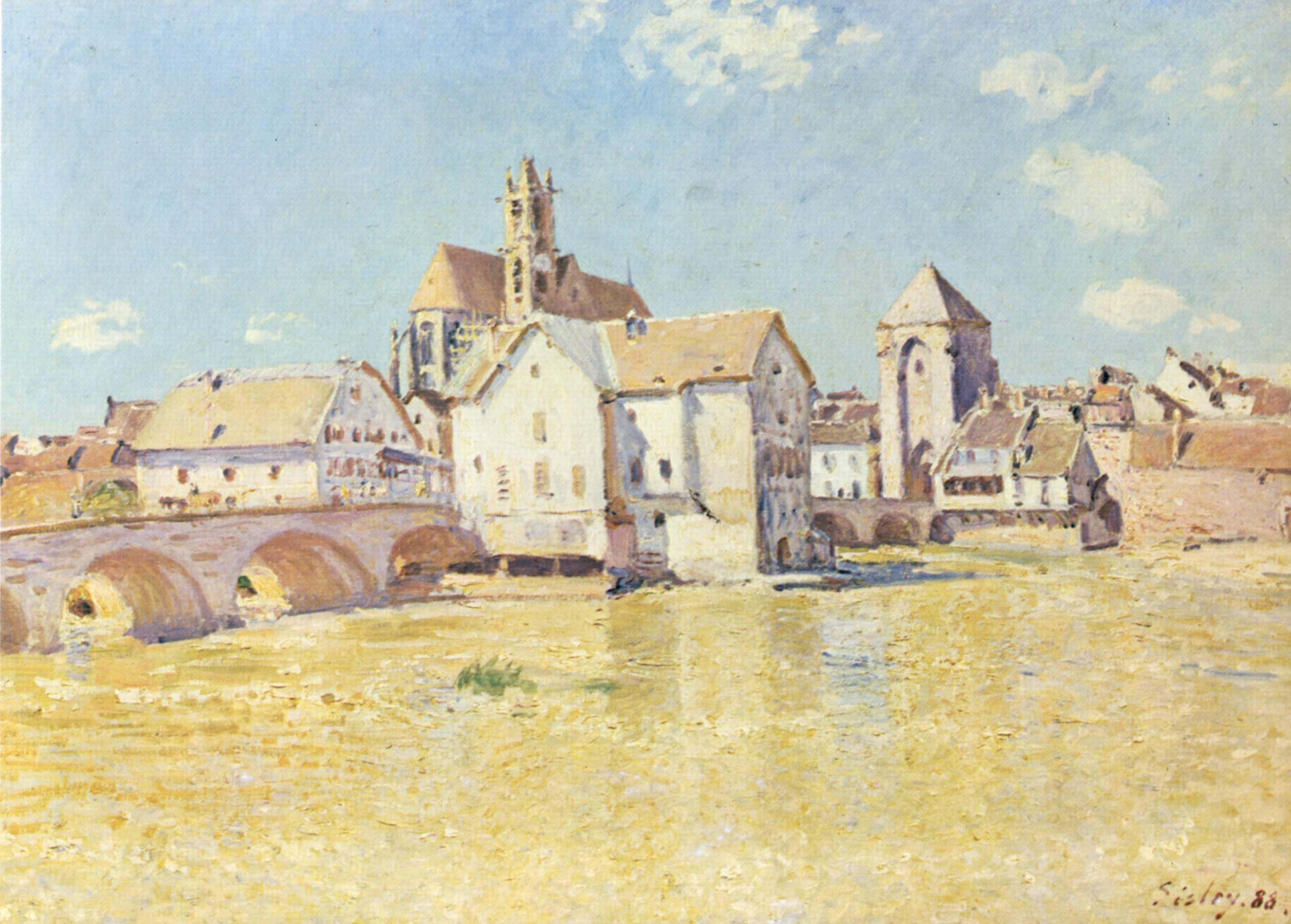
- Moret-sur-Loing, Alfred Sisley, 1888

- Coat of arms
- Location of Moret-sur-Loing
- Location within France Location within Île-de-France (region)
- Coordinates: 48°22′28″N 2°48′54″E
- Country: France
- Region: Île-de-France
- Department: Seine-et-Marne
- Arrondissement: Fontainebleau
- Canton: Montereau-Fault-Yonne
- Commune: Moret-Loing-et-Orvanne
- Area^{1}: 4.94 km^{2} (1.91 sq mi)
- Highest elevation: 98 m (322 ft)
- Lowest elevation: 45 m (148 ft)
- Population (2022): 4,169
  - Density: 844/km^{2} (2,190/sq mi)
- Time zone: UTC+01:00 (CET)
  - Summer (DST): UTC+02:00 (CEST)
- Postal code: 77250
- ^{1} French Land Register data, which excludes lakes, ponds, glaciers > 1 km^{2} (0.386 sq mi or 247 acres) and river estuaries.

French pronunciation: [mɔʁɛ syʁ lwɛ̃], literally Moret on Loing) is a former commune in the Seine-et-Marne department located at the Île-de-France region in north-central France. It is situated along the confluence of the rivers Loing and Seine. Moret–Veneux-les-Sablons station has rail connections to Montargis, Melun, Montereau-Fault-Yonne, Laroche-Migennes and Paris.

On 1 January 2015, Moret-sur-Loing and Écuelles merged, becoming the commune of Orvanne, which in turn merged into the new commune of Moret-Loing-et-Orvanne on 1 January 2016.

The town was a source of inspiration for Monet, Renoir, and Sisley.

== Demographics ==
Inhabitants of Moret-sur-Loing are called Morétains.

== Twin towns ==
Moret-sur-Loing is twinned with:

- (Republic of Ireland) Kilkenny, County Kilkenny, Ireland
- Külsheim, Baden-Württemberg, Germany

== See also ==
- Château de Moret
- Communes of the Seine-et-Marne department

== Famous people ==
- Alfred Sisley (1839–1899), painter, lived and died in Moret
- Sarah Tyson Hallowell (1846–1924), American art curator, lived and died in Moret
- Harriet Hallowell (1873–1943), American artist, lived and died in Moret
- Eliza Pratt Greatorex (1819–1897), Irish-American artist, lived and died in Moret (Les Remparts, Rue des Fossés)
- Karl Cartier (1855–1925), painter.
- Marina Tsvetaïeva (1892–1941), Russian poet
- Prudent Pohl, dit Zanaroff (1885–1966), painter
- George Grey Barnard (1863–1938), American sculptor and collector of medieval art had his workshop in Moret from 1903 to 1911

== Gallery ==
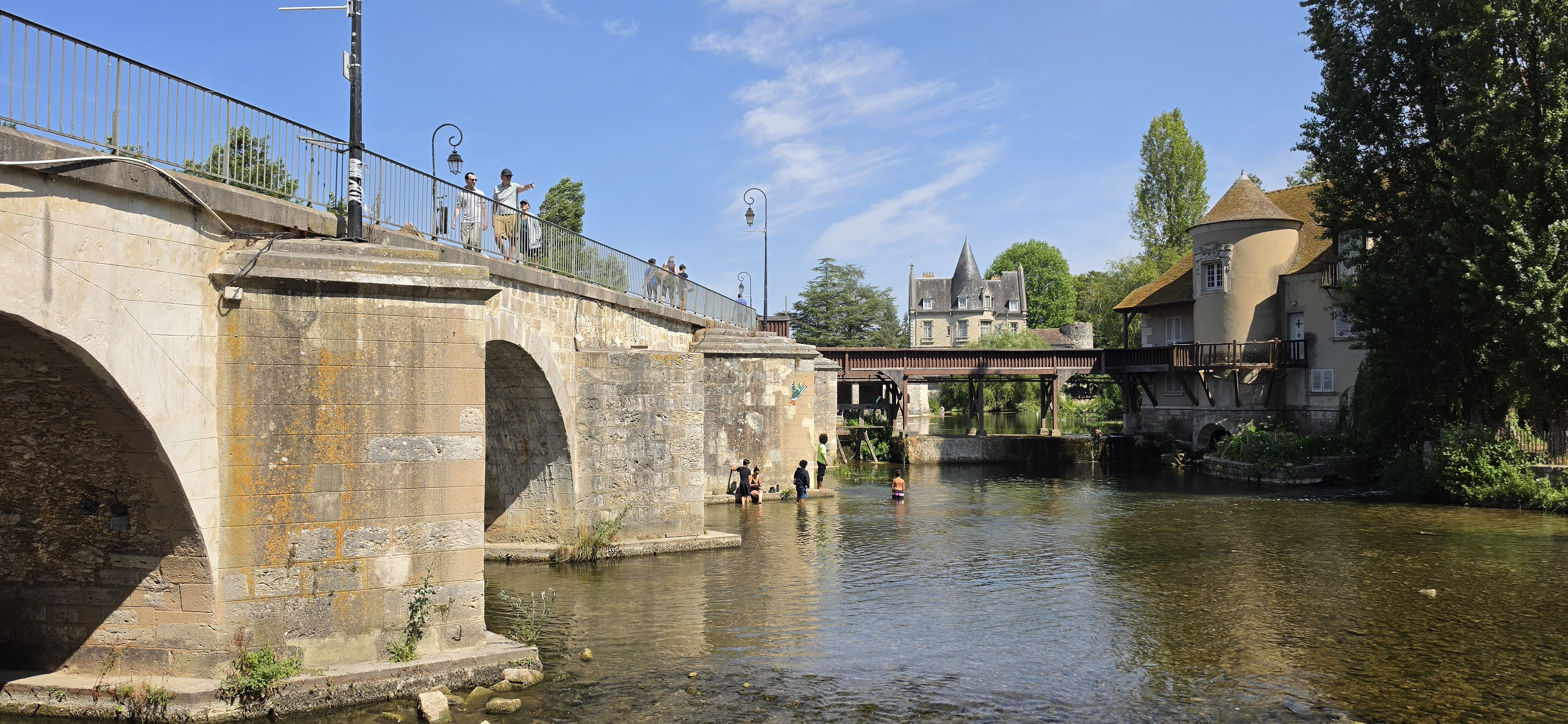
The 12th-century bridge over the Loing River, with the old mill of Moret in the background, as often depicted in Impressionist paintings.

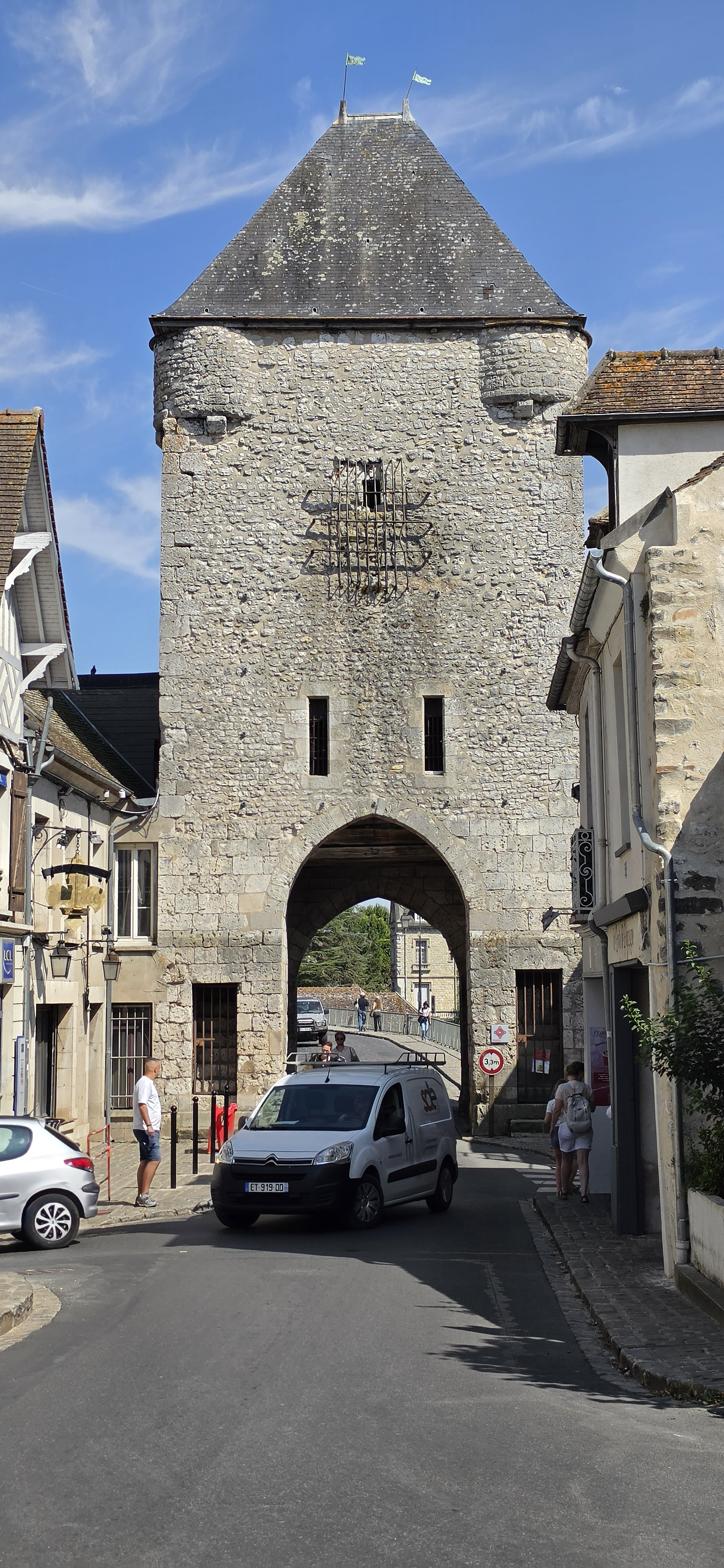
The Porte de Bourgogne.
