= Joseph Charles Hippolyte Crosse =

French zoologist (1826–1898)

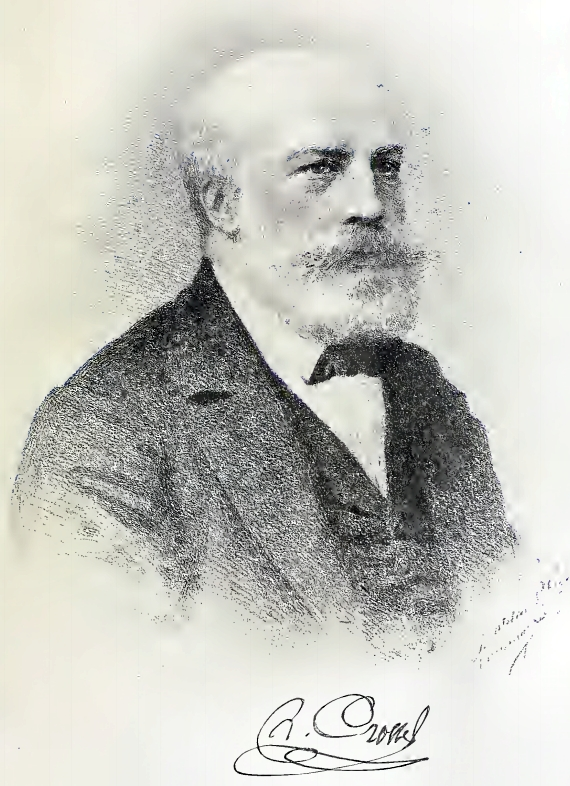
- Born: 1 October 1826; Paris, France
- Died: 7 August 1898 (aged 71); Fontainebleau, France
- Scientific career
- Fields: Conchologist

Joseph Charles Hippolyte Crosse (1 October 1826 – 7 August 1898) was a French conchologist.

With Paul-Henri Fischer, he was co-editor of Journal de Conchyliologie (from 1861). Crosse was the author of over 300 works on Mollusca.

He lived in the Château d'Argeville near Fontainebleau and died there on 7 August 1898. The first Journal de Conchyliologie issue of 1899 was dedicated to his life and work.

== Works ==
- Notice sur les bulimes de la Nouvelle-Calédonie, et description de deux espèces nouvelles (1855).
- Descriptions de coquilles nouvelles (1859).
- Un Mollusque bien maltraité, ou Comment M. Victor-Hugo comprend l'organisation du poulpe (1866).
- Diagnoses molluscorum novorum Guatemalae et Reipublicae Mexicanae (1868).
- Études sur les mollusques terrestres et fluviatiles du Mexique et du Guatémala (avec Paul Fischer, 1870–1900).
- Contribution à la faune malacologique de Nossi-Bé et de Nossi-Comba (1882).
- Histoire physique, naturelle et politique de Madagascar, publiée par Alfred Grandidier. Volume XXV. Histoire naturelle des mollusques (avec Paul Fischer, 1889).
- Faune malacologique terrestre et fluviatile de l'Ile de al Trinité (Antilles) (1890).
- Faune malacologique terrestre et fluviatile de la Nouvelle-Calédonie et de ses dépendances (1894).
