= A6 autoroute =

Controlled-access motorway from Paris to Lyon, France

A6 autoroute
- Autoroute du Soleil

Route information
- Part of E15 / E21 / E60 / E70
- Maintained by : DIR Île-De-France between Wissous and Lisses; APRR between Lisses and Limonest;
- Length: 445.6 km (276.9 mi)
- Existed: 1960–present

Major junctions
- West end: E5 / A 6a / E15 / E50 / A 6b in Wissous (Paris)

- A 77 in Poligny; E60 / E511 / A 19 in Piffonds; A 38 in Pouilly-en-Auxois; E17 / E21 / A 31 in Beaune; E21 / A 40 in Sancé; E62 / A 406 in Mâcon; E15 / A 46 in Ambérieux; E70 / A 466 in Les Chères; E70 / A 89 in Limonest (Lyon)
- East end: M 6 in Limonest

Location
- Country: France

Highway system
- Roads in France; Autoroutes; Routes nationales

The A6 autoroute (French: Autoroute A6), also known simply as the A6 or, along with the A7, as the Autoroute du Soleil ([otoʁut dy sɔlɛj]; English: Motorway of the Sun), is an autoroute (motorway) in France, linking Paris to Lyon. The motorway starts at Paris's Porte d'Orléans and Porte d'Italie with two branches, numbered A6a and A6b respectively, which join south of Paris. At Limonest ahead of Lyon, it becomes the M6.

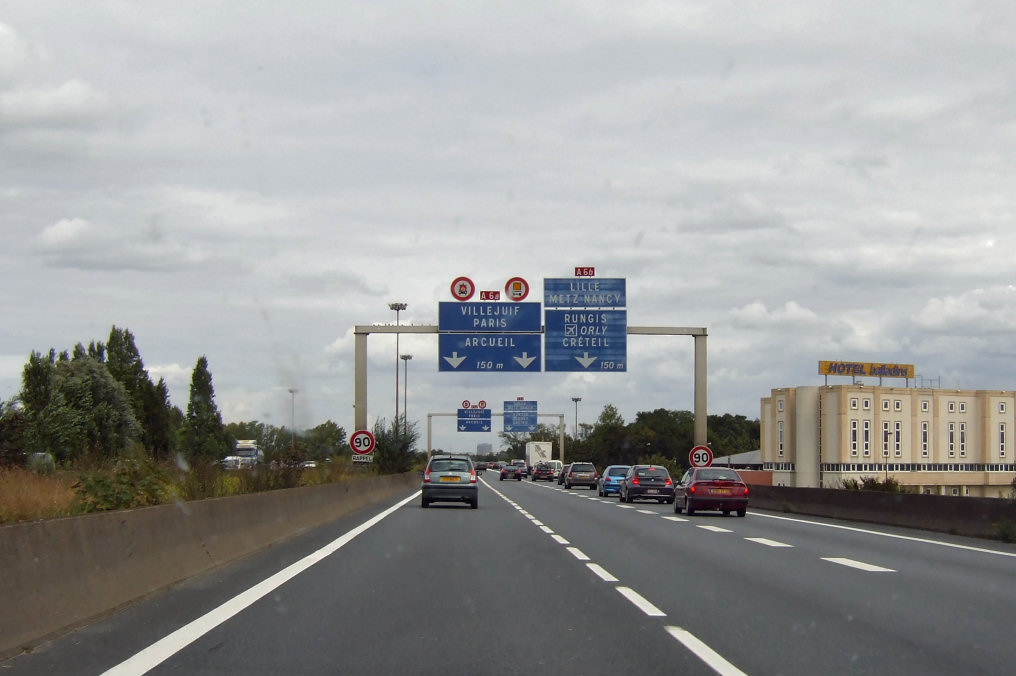
A6a and A6b at Paris

The motorway is favoured by holidaymakers as it is the main link to the South of France (A7) and the French Riviera (A8). At 455 km long it is France's third longest autoroute after the A10 autoroute and the A4 autoroute.

The A6 motorway used to be prone to severe traffic jams around Fourvière Tunnel near Lyon prior to the opening in 1992 of A46 autoroute and in 2011 of the A432 autoroute which is also called the "Contournement de Lyon" and known as the "Lyon Rocade Est".

A 200-kilometre (120-mile) stretch of the A6 motorway around Mâcon, Chalon-sur-Saône and Montceau-les-Mines, France, is known for the A6 disappearances, a number of mysterious disappearances or other crimes involving women and girls, occurring in the 1980s, 1990s and 2000s.

== List of Exits and Junctions ==
=== A6a ===
Region	Department	km	mi	Junctions	Destinations	Notes
Île-de-France	Paris	-0.30	-0.18	Boulevard Périphérique - A6a + 1 : Porte d'Orléans	Rouen (A13), Porte de Châtillon	Entry and exit only from Western Ring (Périphérique - Ouest)
Île-de-France	Paris	-0.30	-0.18	Boulevard Périphérique - A6a + 1 : Porte d'Orléans	Paris - centre	Exit and entry from Lyon
Île-de-France	Paris	-0.15	-0.09	Rue du Professeur-Hyacinthe-Vincent	Paris	Exit only from Lyon and only for taxis and buses
Île-de-France	Paris	0.0	0.0	Boulevard Périphérique		Entry from Eastern Ring (Périphérique - Est) and from Porte de Gentilly
Île-de-France	Val-de-Marne	2	1.24	A6b - A6a	A4 - A1, Arcueil, Villejuif, Paris - Porte d'Italie	Entry and exit from Lyon
Île-de-France	Val-de-Marne	6	3.72	A106 - A6a	Aéroport d'Orly	Entry and exit from Paris
Île-de-France	Val-de-Marne	6	3.72	3 : Rungis	Rungis, Marché international de Rungis	Entry and exit only from Paris
Île-de-France	Essonne	10	6.21	A10 - A6a	Bordeaux, Nantes (A11), Massy, Palaiseau, Étampes	Entry and exit only from Paris
E5 / A 6a becomes E15 / A 6
1.000 mi = 1.609 km; 1.000 km = 0.621 mi

=== A6b ===
Region	Department	km	mi	Junctions	Destinations	Notes
Île-de-France	Paris	0.3	0.18	Boulevard Périphérique - A6b + 1 : Porte d'Italie	Metz-Nancy (A4), Lille (A1),	Entry and exit only from Eastern Ring (Périphérique - Est)
Île-de-France	Paris	0.3	0.18	Boulevard Périphérique - A6b + 1 : Porte d'Italie	Paris	Exit and entry from Lyon
Île-de-France	Val-de-Marne	3	1.86	2 : Villejuif	Villejuif, Arcueil	Entry and exit only from Lyon
Île-de-France	Val-de-Marne	4	2.48	A6a - A6b	Rouen (A13), Paris - Porte d'Orléans	Entry and exit from Lyon
Île-de-France	Val-de-Marne	6	3.72	A106 - A6b	Aéroport d'Orly	Entry and exit from Paris
Île-de-France	Val-de-Marne	6	3.72	3 : Rungis	Rungis, Marché international de Rungis	Entry and exit only from Paris
Île-de-France	Val-de-Marne	8	4.97	A86 & RN 186 - A6	Créteil, Versailles, Antony, L'Haÿ-les-Roses	Entry and exit from Lyon & Exit to Paris
Île-de-France	Essonne	10	6.21	A10 - A6b	Bordeaux, Nantes, Massy, Palaiseau, Étampes	Entry and exit only from Paris
E15 / E50 / A 6b becomes E15 / A 6
1.000 mi = 1.609 km; 1.000 km = 0.621 mi

=== A6 ===
Region	Department	km	mi	Junctions	Destinations	Notes
Île-de-France	Essonne	10	6.21	A6a & A6b - A6	Paris - Porte d'Orléans (Westbound Ring)	
Île-de-France	Essonne	10	6.21	A6a & A6b - A6	A86, Paris - Porte d'Italie (Eastbound Ring), Aéroport d'Orly, Marché international de Rungis	
Île-de-France	Essonne	13	8.07	4 : Wissous + A126 - A6	Chilly-Mazarin, Wissous	
Île-de-France	Essonne	13	8.07	4 : Wissous + A126 - A6	Massy-Palaiseau	
Île-de-France	Essonne	14	8.69	5 : Chilly-Mazarin	Chilly-Mazarin, Longjumeau	
Île-de-France	Essonne	17	10.56	6 : Savigny-sur-Orge	Savigny-sur-Orge, Épinay-sur-Orge, Villemoisson-sur-Orge, Sainte-Geneviève-des-Bois, Morsang-sur-Orge	
Île-de-France	Essonne	20	12.4	7 : Viry-Châtillon	Viry-Châtillon, Fleury-Mérogis	Entry and exit only from Paris
Île-de-France	Essonne	22	13.6	7.1 : Grigny	Grigny, Ris-Orangis	
Île-de-France	Essonne	24	14.9	7 : Ris-Orangis	Viry-Châtillon, Grigny, Ris-Orangis	Entry and exit only from Lyon
Île-de-France	Essonne	26	16.1	RN 104 (Westbound) - A6	Versailles, Rouen (A13), Bordeaux-Nantes (A10), Bondoufle	
Île-de-France	Essonne	28	17.3	RN 104 (Eastbound) - A6	(A1-A4), Évry-Courcouronnes, Corbeil-Essonnes, Sénart, Marne-la-Vallée, Troyes (A5), Lisses - centre	
Île-de-France	Essonne	29	18.0	9 : Villabé	Lisses - Z. I., Villabé, Mennecy	
Île-de-France	Essonne	29	18.0	9 : Villabé	Aire de Lisses (Southbound); Aire de Villabé (Northbound)	
Île-de-France	Essonne	33	20.5	10 : Corbeil-Essonnes	Corbeil-Essonnes, Mennecy, Ormoy	Entry and exit only from Lyon
Île-de-France	Essonne	34	21.1	11 : Le Coudray-Montceaux	Le Coudray-Montceaux, Auvernaux, Mennecy	Entry and exit only from Paris
Île-de-France	Essonne	35	21.7	12 : Saint-Fargeau-Ponthierry	Saint-Fargeau-Ponthierry	Entry and exit only from Paris
Île-de-France	Seine-et-Marne	44	27.3	RN 37 - A6	Cély-en-Bière, Fontainebleau, Montargis (RN 7), Étampes, Melun	
Île-de-France	Seine-et-Marne	47	28.5	13 : Cély-en-Bière	Cély-en-Bière, Milly-la-Forêt, Melun, Étampes	
Île-de-France	Seine-et-Marne	Péage de Fleury-en-Bière				
Île-de-France	Seine-et-Marne	Aire d'Arbonne (Northbound)				
Île-de-France	Seine-et-Marne	Aire d'Achères-la-Forêt (Southbound); Aire d'Achères (Northbound)				
Île-de-France	Seine-et-Marne	61	37.9	14 : Ury	Malesherbes, Ury	Entry and exit only from Paris
Île-de-France	Seine-et-Marne	Aire de Villiers (Southbound)				
Île-de-France	Seine-et-Marne	70	43.4	15 : Fontainebleau	Fontainebleau	Entry and exit only from Lyon
Île-de-France	Seine-et-Marne	72	44.7	16 : Nemours	Montereau-Fault-Yonne, Nemours	
Île-de-France	Seine-et-Marne	Aire de Nemours (Southbound); Aire de Darvault (Northbound)				
Île-de-France	Seine-et-Marne	80	49.7	A77 - A6	Montargis, Nevers	
Île-de-France	Seine-et-Marne	Aire de Sonneville (Southbound); Aire de Floée (Northbound)				
Île-de-France	Seine-et-Marne	Aire du Liard (Southbound); Aire d'Égreville (Northbound)				
Centre-Val de Loire	Loiret	Aire du Parc Thierry (Southbound); Aire de la Roche (Northbound)				
Bourgogne-Franche-Comté	Yonne	111	68.97	17 : Courtenay	Courtenay, Montargis, Orléans, Sens	
Bourgogne-Franche-Comté	Yonne	112	69.59	A19 - A6	Troyes (A5), Sens, Montargis, Orléans (A10), Paris - est	
Bourgogne-Franche-Comté	Yonne	E15 / A 6 becomes E15 / E60 / A 6				
Bourgogne-Franche-Comté	Yonne	Aire des Châtaigniers (Southbound)				
Bourgogne-Franche-Comté	Yonne	Aire de la Réserve (Southbound); Aire de la Couline (Northbound)				
Bourgogne-Franche-Comté	Yonne	128	79.53	18 : Joigny	Joigny, Sépeaux-Saint-Romain, Migennes, Toucy, Charny, Châteaurenard	
Bourgogne-Franche-Comté	Yonne	Aire de La Racheuse (Southbound); Aire de La Loupière (Northbound)				
Bourgogne-Franche-Comté	Yonne	Aire de La Biche (Southbound); Aire des Pâtures (Northbound)				
Bourgogne-Franche-Comté	Yonne	153	95.0	19 : Auxerre - nord	Auxerre, Monéteau, Migennes, Joigny	
Bourgogne-Franche-Comté	Yonne	Aire des Bois-Impériaux (Southbound); Aire du Thureau (Northbound)				
Bourgogne-Franche-Comté	Yonne	165	102.5	20 : Auxerre - sud	Auxerre, Chablis, Tonnerre, Ancy-le-Franc, Cry	
Bourgogne-Franche-Comté	Yonne	Aire de Venoy-Chablis (Southbound); Aire de Venoy-Soleil Levant (Northbound)				
Bourgogne-Franche-Comté	Yonne	Aire de la Grosse Tour (Southbound); Aire du Buisson Rond (Northbound)				
Bourgogne-Franche-Comté	Yonne	Aire du Chevreuil (Wastbound); Aire de la Couée (Northbound)				
Bourgogne-Franche-Comté	Yonne	190	118.0	21 : Nitry	Nitry, Montbard, Tonnerre, Chablis	
Bourgogne-Franche-Comté	Yonne	Aire de Montmorency (Southbound); Aire d'Hervaux (Northbound)				
Bourgogne-Franche-Comté	Yonne	209	129.8	22 : Avallon	Avallon, Saulieu	
Bourgogne-Franche-Comté	Yonne	Aire de La Chaponne (Southbound); Aire de Maison-Dieu (Northbound)				
Bourgogne-Franche-Comté	Côte-d'Or					
Bourgogne-Franche-Comté	Côte-d'Or	Aire de Genetoy (Northbound); Aire d'Époisses (Southbound)				
Bourgogne-Franche-Comté	Côte-d'Or	Aire de Ruffey (Southbound); Aire de la Côme (Northbound)				
Bourgogne-Franche-Comté	Côte-d'Or	235	146.0	23 : Bierre-lès-Semur	Semur-en-Auxois, Montbard, Saulieu	
Bourgogne-Franche-Comté	Côte-d'Or	Aire de Fermenot (Southbound); Aire de Marcigny (Northbound)				
Bourgogne-Franche-Comté	Côte-d'Or	Aire du Chien Blanc (Southbound); Aire des Lochères (Northbound)				
Bourgogne-Franche-Comté	Côte-d'Or	264	164.0	A38 - A6	Dijon, Pouilly-en-Auxois, Autun, Saulieu	
Bourgogne-Franche-Comté	Côte-d'Or	Aire de Chaignot (Southbound); Aire de La Repotte (Northbound)				
Bourgogne-Franche-Comté	Côte-d'Or	Aire de La Garenne (Southbound)				
Bourgogne-Franche-Comté	Côte-d'Or	Aire de La Forêt (Southbound); Aire du Creux-Moreau (Northbound)				
Bourgogne-Franche-Comté	Côte-d'Or	Aire du Bois-des-Corbeaux (Southbound); Aire du Rossignol (Northbound)				
Bourgogne-Franche-Comté	Côte-d'Or	Aire de Savigny-lès-Beaune (Northbound)				
Bourgogne-Franche-Comté	Côte-d'Or	301	187.0	24 : Beaune - nord	Beaune - centre, Saint-Nicolas, Savigny-lès-Beaune	
Bourgogne-Franche-Comté	Côte-d'Or	304	188.8	A31 - A6	Dijon, Besançon (A36), Metz-Nancy, Lille (A5)	
Bourgogne-Franche-Comté	Côte-d'Or	E15 / E60 / A 6 becomes E15 / E21 / A 6				
Bourgogne-Franche-Comté	Côte-d'Or	307	190.7	24.1 : Beaune - sud	Beaune - centre, Hospices, Chagny	
Bourgogne-Franche-Comté	Côte-d'Or	Aire de Beaune-Tailly (Southbound); Aire de Beaune-Merceuil (Northbound)				
Bourgogne-Franche-Comté	Saône-et-Loire					
Bourgogne-Franche-Comté	Saône-et-Loire	Aire du Curney (Southbound); Aire de La Loyère (Northbound)				
Bourgogne-Franche-Comté	Saône-et-Loire	325	201.9	25.1 : Chalon - nord	Chalon-sur-Saône, Champforgeuil, Fragnes-la-Loyère, Farges-lès-Chalon, SaôneOr	Entry and exit from Paris
Bourgogne-Franche-Comté	Saône-et-Loire	329	204.4	25.2 : Chalon - centre	Chalon-sur-Saône - nord, Autun, Châtenoy-le-Royal, Chagny, SaôneOr	
Bourgogne-Franche-Comté	Saône-et-Loire	335	208.1	26 : Chalon - sud	Chalon-sur-Saône, Le Creusot, Montceau-les-Mines, Lons-le-Saunier, Autun	
Bourgogne-Franche-Comté	Saône-et-Loire	Aire de La Ferté (Southbound); Aire de Saint-Ambreuil (Northbound)				
Bourgogne-Franche-Comté	Saône-et-Loire	Aire de Jugy (Southbound); Aire de Boyer (Northbound)				
Bourgogne-Franche-Comté	Saône-et-Loire	355	220.5	27 : Tournus	Tournus	
Bourgogne-Franche-Comté	Saône-et-Loire	Aire de Farges (Southbound); Aire de Uchizy (Northbound)				
Bourgogne-Franche-Comté	Saône-et-Loire	Aire de Mâcon-Saint-Albain (Southbound); Aire de Mâcon-La Salle (Northbound)				
Bourgogne-Franche-Comté	Saône-et-Loire	381	236.7	28 : Mâcon - nord	Mâcon, Pont-de-Vaux	
Bourgogne-Franche-Comté	Saône-et-Loire	383	237.9	A40 - A6	Genève, Milan, Bourg-en-Bresse	Entry and exit only from Paris
Bourgogne-Franche-Comté	Saône-et-Loire	E15 / E21 / A 6 becomes E15 / A 6				
Bourgogne-Franche-Comté	Saône-et-Loire	391	242.9	29 : Mâcon - sud (A406)	Mâcon - centre, Moulins (A79), Charolles, Pont-de-Veyle, Charnay-lès-Mâcon, Thoissey, Bourg-en-Bresse (A40)	
Bourgogne-Franche-Comté	Saône-et-Loire	Aire de Crêches (Southbound); Aire des Sablons (Northbound)				
Auvergne-Rhône-Alpes	Rhône					
Auvergne-Rhône-Alpes	Rhône	Aire de Dracé (Southbound); Aire de Taponas (Northbound)				
Auvergne-Rhône-Alpes	Rhône	412	256.0	30 : Belleville	Belleville-en-Beaujolais, Châtillon-sur-Chalaronne, Thoissey	
Auvergne-Rhône-Alpes	Rhône	Aire de Patural (Southbound); Aire de Boitray (Northbound)				
Auvergne-Rhône-Alpes	Rhône	421	261.5	31.1 : Villefranche - nord	Villefranche, Arnas, Jassans-Riottier	
Auvergne-Rhône-Alpes	Rhône	426	264.7	31.2 : Villefranche - Ville	Villefranche - sud, Jassans-Riottier, Roanne	
Auvergne-Rhône-Alpes	Rhône	Péage de Villefranche-Limas				
Auvergne-Rhône-Alpes	Rhône	431	267.8	A46 - A6	Marseille (A7), Genève (A42), Lyon - est, Saint-Exupéry, Grenoble (A43)	Entry and exit only from Paris
Auvergne-Rhône-Alpes	Rhône	E15 / A 6 becomes A 6				
Auvergne-Rhône-Alpes	Rhône	433	269.0	32 : Anse	Anse, Quincieux	
Auvergne-Rhône-Alpes	Rhône	Aire des Chères - Ouest (Southbound); Aire des Chères - Est (Northbound)				
Auvergne-Rhône-Alpes	Rhône	437	271.5	A466 - A6	Genève (A42), Lyon - est (A46), Grenoble (A43), Saint-Exupéry	Entry and exit from Lyon
Auvergne-Rhône-Alpes	Rhône	A 6 becomes E70 / A 6				
Auvergne-Rhône-Alpes	Rhône	442	274.6	A89 - A6	Bordeaux, Clermont-Ferrand, Roanne	
Auvergne-Rhône-Alpes	Rhône	E15 / A 6 becomes A 6				
Auvergne-Rhône-Alpes	Rhône	445	276.5	33 : Limonest	Limonest - La Garde, Dardilly, Porte de Lyon	
1.000 mi = 1.609 km; 1.000 km = 0.621 mi

=== M6 ===
Italics indicate

Region	Department	km	mi	Junction	Destinations	Notes
Auvergne-Rhône-Alpes	Rhône	446	277.1	34 : Dardilly	Techlid - Pôle Économique, Dardilly	
Auvergne-Rhône-Alpes	Rhône	Aire de Paisy (Northbound)				
Auvergne-Rhône-Alpes	Rhône	449	278.9	35 : Écully	Écully, Champagne-au-Mont-d'Or, Campus Lyon Ouest Écully La Sauvegarde, Grand Ouest	
Auvergne-Rhône-Alpes	Rhône	449	278.9	36 : Porte du Valvert	Tassin, Lyon - Vaise, Boulevard périphérique de Lyon, Marseille (A7), Genève (A42), Grenoble (A43)	
Auvergne-Rhône-Alpes	Rhône	451	280.2	37 : Lyon - Ménival	Tassin-la-Demi-Lune, Lyon - Vaise	Entry and exit only from Lyon
Auvergne-Rhône-Alpes	Rhône	453	281.4	38 : Lyon - Vaise	Lyon	Entry and exit only from Lyon
Auvergne-Rhône-Alpes	Rhône	455	282.7	39a : Vieux-Lyon	Lyon	Entry and exit only from Paris
Auvergne-Rhône-Alpes	Rhône	455	282.7	39b : Lyon - centre	Lyon, Perrache, Lyon - Presqu'Île, La Confluence, Perrache	Entry and exit only from Paris
Auvergne-Rhône-Alpes	Rhône	455	282.7	39c : Lyon - Part-Dieu	Lyon , Saint-Joseph Saint-Luc	
M 6 becomes M 7 (A7)
1.000 mi = 1.609 km; 1.000 km = 0.621 mi
