= A19 autoroute =

Road in France

A19 autoroute
- Grand contournement and L'Éco-Autoroute
- Grand contournement (light blue) compared with the three ring roads: the Francilienne (green), A86 (dark blue) and the Périphérique (innermost, orange)

Route information
- Part of E60 / E511
- Maintained by APRR and ARCOUR
- Length: 131.2 km (81.5 mi)
- Existed: 1993–present

Major junctions
- East end: E54 / E511 / A 5 in La Chapelle-sur-Oreuse near Sens

- E15 / E60 / A 6 in Savigny-sur-Clairis near Courtenay; A 77 in Treilles-en-Gâtinais near Montargis

- West end: E5 / E60 / A 10 in Chevilly near Artenay

Location
- Country: France
- Major cities: Beauvais, Amiens, Abbeville, Boulogne-sur-Mer, Calais, Dunkerque

Highway system
- Roads in France; Autoroutes; Routes nationales

The A19 autoroute is a motorway in France it connects the A5 with A10 between Sens in Yonne and Artenay in Loiret also connected with A6 in Courtenay in Loiret. It is 131.2 kilometres (81.5 mi) long. The extension to the A10 autoroute near Orléans was completed in January 2011. The A19 is part of the outermost Paris ring road.

== Section from A5 (Sens) to A6 (Courtenay) ==
=== Facts ===
The motorway is managed by the Paris-Rhine-Rhone company. The A19 is a toll motorway and is 2x2 lanes. It 30 km is long.

=== History ===
- 1993: Start of construction of 5 km section of the A160 from the A5 to RN6 (the future A19).
- 1997: Start of the 25 km section to Courtenay

== Section from A6 (Courtenay) to A10 (Artenay) ==
=== Facts ===
The motorway is operated by Arcour, a subsidiary company of the company VINCI. There are proposals to extend the road from Courtenay at exit 17 of the A6. In time the road will be extended from Courtenay to Artenay, providing a connection between the A10 to A6 motorways a total length of 101 km

=== History ===
The link from Courtenay to Artenay has been opened on 16 June 2009. This allows a connection between the A5, A6, A77, and A10.

== Lists of Exits and junctions ==
Region	Department	km	mi	Junctionss	Destinations	Notes
Bourgogne-Franche-Comté	Yonne	0.0	0.0	A5 - A19	Montereau-Fault-Yonne, Fontainebleau, Paris, Troyes, Metz - Nancy (A4)	
Bourgogne-Franche-Comté	Yonne	4	2.48	1 : Saint-Denis-lès-Sens	Sens - centre, Provins, Pont-sur-Yonne, Nogent-sur-Seine	
Bourgogne-Franche-Comté	Yonne	Aire de Villeroy				
Bourgogne-Franche-Comté	Yonne	18	11.1	2 : Villeneuve-la-Dondagre	Subligny, Paron, Saint-Valérien, Sens - Rive-Gauche	
Bourgogne-Franche-Comté	Yonne	30	18.6	A6 - A19	Auxerre, Lyon, Dijon, Courtenay - est, Paris	
Bourgogne-Franche-Comté	Yonne	E511 / A 19 becomes E60 / A 19				
Centre-Val de Loire	Loiret	31	19.2	3 : Savigny-sur-Clairis	Sens, Savigny-sur-Clairis, Villeneuve-sur-Yonne	Entry and exit only from Artenay
Centre-Val de Loire	Loiret	36	22.3	4 : Saint-Hilaire	Montargis, Courtenay - ouest, Saint-Hilaire	
Centre-Val de Loire	Loiret	Aire de Chantecoq (eastbound); Aire de Philippe Rossi (westbound)				
Centre-Val de Loire	Loiret	55	34.1	5 : Fontenay-sur-Loing	Montargis - nord, Châlette-sur-Loing, Ferrières-en-Gâtinais, Fontenay-sur-Loing	
Centre-Val de Loire	Loiret	Aire de la Vallée du Loing (eastbound); Aire de Cepoy (westbound)				
Centre-Val de Loire	Loiret	63	39.1	A77 - A19	Paris, Fontainebleau, Nevers, Montargis - centre	
Centre-Val de Loire	Loiret	79	49.0	6 : Auxy	Malesherbes, Bellegarde, Beaune-la-Rolande, Beaumont-du-Gâtinais, Auxy	
Centre-Val de Loire	Loiret	79	49.0	6 : Auxy	Aire de Loiret	
Centre-Val de Loire	Loiret	100	62.1	7 : Escrennes	Fontainebleau, Pithiviers, Neuville-aux-Bois, Escrennes	
Centre-Val de Loire	Loiret	Aire de Teillay (eastbound); Aire de Mauregard (westbound)				
Centre-Val de Loire	Loiret	129	80.1	A10 - A19	Bordeaux, Orléans, Chartres, Artenay, Paris (A6)	
1.000 mi = 1.609 km; 1.000 km = 0.621 mi
