= Route nationale 6 =

Road in France

The Route nationale 6 is a trunk road (nationale) in France between Paris and the frontier with Italy in the Alps.

== Reclassification ==
The RN 6 runs parallel for a long portion of its route to the A 6 autoroute. As a result, portions of the road have now been downgraded as the RD 306, RD606 and RD 906. The reclassification is in part due to the centralized system of the French Government that did not allow local communities to care for the 'Nationale' roads infrastructure. Downgrading the Nationale 6 to local roads (RD for Route Départementale) allows the locals to take care of their infrastructure.

== Route ==
Paris-Fontainebleau–Sens–Auxerre–Chalon-sur-Saône–Lyon–Chambéry-Italy

=== Paris to Sens (0 to 104 km) ===
The road starts at Porte de Charenton south east of the city north of the Seine. The road is called the Rue de Paris and it skirts the Southern edge of the Bois de Vincennes. The road crosses the river Marne at the Pont de Charenton as well as the A 4. The road heads through the suburbs of Paris, after a junction with the RN 19 the RN 6 becomes Avenue du Général Leclerc and then Avenue du Général de Gaulle. The road passes Maisons-Alfort and enters an industrial area as Avenue du Maréchal and runs parallel to railway yards before passing along the East bank of the Seine. The road then bypasses Montgeron and enters Forêt domaniale de Sénart and a junction with the RN 104 before becoming the A 5 and then branching off to the South. The old road passes through Lieusaint.

The RN 6 enters Melun where it crosses the Seine and heads south through the Forêt domaniale de Fontainebleau and heads to Fontainebleau and a junction with the RN 7. The old road passes through Vulaines-sur-Seine and Veneux-les-Sablons before the new road rejoins the old course after crossing the river Loing in Moret-Loing-et-Orvanne.

The road then heads east along the south bank of the river Seine and then the river Yonne. It was along this stretch that Albert Camus was killed in 1960 when his driver lost control and struck a plane tree in Villeblevin; but most of the villages along the road are now bypassed. Crossing the river at Pont-sur-Yonne the road is overlooked by the Bois de Châtillon (180m). Since on the East bank the road crosses the A 19 and enters the cathedral city of Sens.

=== Sens to Lyon (104 km to 440 km) ===
After Sens, the road heads South following the Yonne valley through rolling countryside. The road crosses the river at Joigny with the Canal de Bourgogne following the river Armançon.

The road crosses the A 6 before Auxerre. South of the town the road takes the river Cure through wooded countryside passing the grottes de Saint-Moc and grottes d'Arcy. 10 km north of Vézelay the road turns east to Avallon in the Vallée du Cousin. The nearby hills now rise to over 380 m. The road continues Southeast through the Bois de Vernon branching south to Saulieu and the Forêt de Saulieu.

To the Southeast in the Forêt de Thoisy the road crosses the main TGV line. The road reaches 490 m above sea level before dropping down into the Arnay-le-Duc in the Arroux valley. The road rises again as it approaches the Saône valley and the cirque du Bout du Monde and the vallon de la Tournée after the Bois de la Chaume. The road passes Baubigny-la-Rochepot and past Mont de Sène (521 m) before bisecting the wine making villages of Puligny-Montrachet and Chassagne-Montrachet. The road enters the heart of Burgundy. The road heads through Chagny before entering Chalon-sur-Saône and the A 6.

The road heads South along the river valley passing through Tournus to Mâcon where it is crossed by the A 40. The road continues South overlooked to the west by a ridge rising to over 800 m. Nearby town include the Beaujolais wine villages of Fleurie, Villié-Morgon and Brouilly. The next major town is Villefranche-sur-Saône before the road heads through the Mont d'Or and into the western suburbs of Lyon and then over the river Saône into the city centre.

=== Lyon to the Frontier of Italy (440 km to 677 km) ===
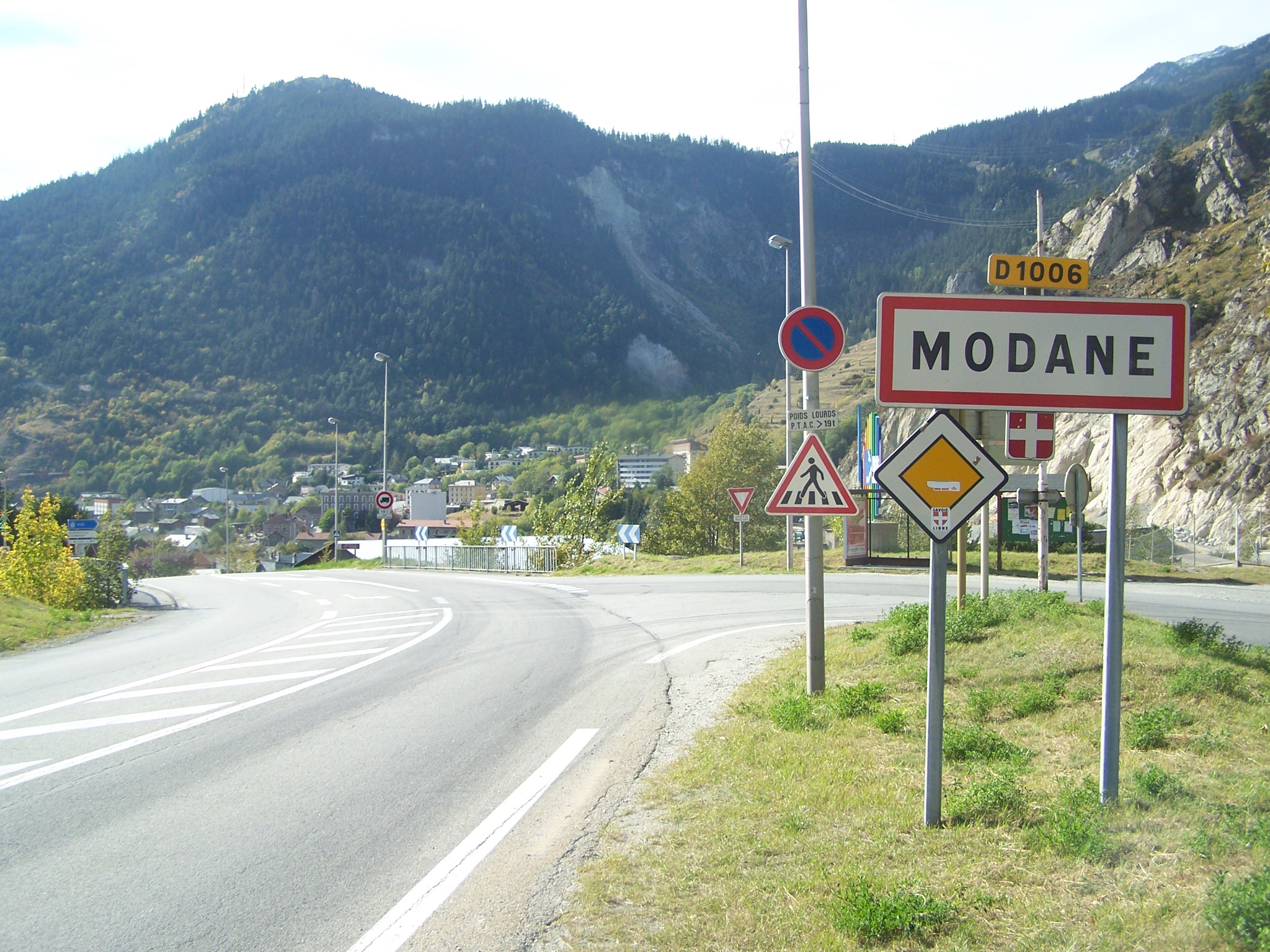
Current D 1006 (part of previous Nationale 6) entering into Modane in Savoie.

The RN 6 heads Southeast out of the city on the Avenue Franklin Roosevelt and passes round the small airfield de Lyon-Bron and into an industrial area parallel to the A 43 and South of the Lyon-Saint-Exupéry Airport . The road passes through the satellite town of Bourgoin-Jallieu towards the foothills of the Alps. The road turns East along the Bourbre valley passing through La Tour-du-Pin. The surrounding countryside rises to 580 m while the road is now about 300 m. After crossing the RN 75 the road reaches Le Pont-de-Beauvoisin on the border of Dauphiné and Savoie. The road heads Southeast taking the gorges de Chailles through the Chaîne de l'Épine (1125 m). The mountains crossed by the roads are the Prealps. At Les Échelles the RN 6 turns north east through the grottes des Échelles and over the Col de Couz (626 m). It then follows the river Hyère to Chambéry (404 m above sea level). The road turns Southeast again towards the Isère valley and junctions with the RN 90, A 41 and A 43.

The RN 6 then follows the Isère valley Northeast for 11 km before crossing the river and taking the Arc valley to the South alongside the A 43 and a railway line. The valley passes between the chaîne des Hurlières (1707 m) and the chaîne de la Lauzière (2829 m). The road continues south along the valley past Saint-Jean-de-Maurienne and skirting the Southern edge of the Massif de la Vanoise. At Orelle a cable car grants access to the Les Trois Vallées Ski system with the Cîme de Caron rising to 3198 m and covered in glaciers. To the South is the resort of Valloire and the RD 902 which passes over the Col du Galibier (2646 m). The road now is part of the Route des Grandes Alps.

At Modane the Autoroute and railway line branch South in tunnels and into Italy. The Fréjus Rail Tunnel was finished in 1871. It had been started by the Sardinian monarchy to link different parts of the kingdom of Sardinia before the border took place there. The Fréjus Road Tunnel is 13 km long and becomes the Autostrada A-32 in Italy. The railway also emerges and heads down the Bardonecchia valley.

The RN 6 however continues eastward along the Arc valley overlooked by snow-capped mountains such as the Dent Parrachée (3697 m). At the village of Lanslebourg-Mont-Cenis (1416 m above sea level) the road heads South climbing steeply to the Col du Mont Cenis (2084 m). The road then passes the Northern shore of the Lac du Mont Cenis in the Massif du Mont Cenis. The road then drops passing below the lakes dam before crossing the frontier with Italy where it becomes the S-25. The pass is closed during winter.

The RD 902 continues in the Arc valley past Bessans and Bonneval-sur-Arc before turning north over the Col de l'Iseran (2764 m) and onto Val-d'Isère. The road is used as a ski run in winter. The RD 902 is a high mountain itinerary linking all the main passes along France's Eastern borders with Italy.
