= A5 autoroute =

Controlled-access highway from Paris's Francilienne to the A31 near Beauchemin

A5 autoroute

Route information
- Part of E17 E54 E511
- Maintained by APRR
- Length: 238 km (148 mi)
- Existed: 1990–present

Major junctions
- West end: N 104 (La Francilienne)

- E54 / A 105 near Melun E511 / A 19 near Sens E17 / A 26 near Troyes

- East end: E17 / E23 / E54 / A 31 near Beauchemin

Location
- Country: France

Highway system
- Roads in France; Autoroutes; Routes nationales

The A5 Autoroute, which was constructed in 1990 to relieve the A6, links the Parisian region with the Langres area. It is a 238 km toll road under the management of the Autoroutes Paris-Rhin-Rhône (APRR). It makes up parts of the European routes E54, E511, and E17. Before the A5 was completed, the section linking Troyes with Langres was known as the A26. This route crosses the departments of Seine-et-Marne (in the Ile-de-France region), Yonne (in the Bourgogne-Franche-Comté region), Aube and Haute-Marne (in the Grand-Est region).

In Île-de-France, before reaching its western terminus at La Francilienne, the A5 splits into two branches which were previously referred to as the A5a and the A5b. They have since been renumbered, with the A5a being designated as the A5 and the A5b becoming part of the A105 (a spur route linking La Francilienne, the A5, and the town of Melun). However, the two branches are often still referred to as the "A5a" and "A5b".

== Proposed Eastern Extension ==
The French Government has given the green light for the completion of the natural continuation of the A5 beyond Langres towards Switzerland and Mulhouse by granting permission for the construction of a toll motorway from Langres to Vesoul currently known as the A319 (planned opening after 2030). The remainder of the section must be supported by the State in the form of a 2 × 2 lane expressway (RN 19) connecting to the A36 between Belfort and Montbéliard and beyond to the A16 Swiss motorway. The combination of the current A5 motorway and this extension could eventually become a future A5 motorway linking Paris to Switzerland.

== List of Exits and Junctions ==
=== A5a ===
Region	Department	Junction	Destinations	Notes
Île-de-France	Essonne	RN 104 - A5a	A6 - A13, Évry, Corbeil-Essonnes, Tigery, Saint-Pierre-du-Perray, Lille, Créteil, Paris (RN 6), Marne-la-Vallée (A4), Parc de PariSud, Combs-la-Ville	
Île-de-France	Seine-et-Marne	10a : Carré Senart	Carré Sénart	
Île-de-France	Seine-et-Marne	10/10b : Savigny - Plessis-le-Roi	Sénart, Carré Sénart, Savigny-le-Temple	
Île-de-France	Seine-et-Marne	10c : Lieusaint	Lieusaint, Moissy-Cramayel	
Île-de-France	Seine-et-Marne	11 : Savigny - centre	Savigny-le-Temple	Eastbound only
Île-de-France	Seine-et-Marne	12 : Savigny - Parc d'Activities	Savigny-le-Temple, Cesson, Vert-Saint-Denis - centre	Eastbound only
Île-de-France	Seine-et-Marne	Aire du Plessis-Picard-Les Poiriers (Eastbound); Aire du Plessis-Picard-Ourdy (Westbound)		
Île-de-France	Seine-et-Marne	13 : Savigny-le-Temple - Plessis-Picard	Cesson, Vert-Saint-Denis, Savigny-le-Temple	Westbound only
Île-de-France	Seine-et-Marne	A105 & A5b - A5 & A5a	Melun, Montereau-Fault-Yonne par RN, Parc d'activité de Vert-Saint-Denis	
Île-de-France	Seine-et-Marne	A105 & A5b - A5 & A5a	Marne-la-Vallée, Paris (A4), Combs-la-Ville, Moissy-Cramayel, Réau	
A 5a becomes A 5
1.000 mi = 1.609 km; 1.000 km = 0.621 mi

=== A5 ===
Region	Department	Junction	Destinations	Notes
Île-de-France	Seine-et-Marne	Péage des Eprunes + Aires des Éprunes		
Île-de-France	Seine-et-Marne	15 : Saint-Germain-Laxis	Melun, Meaux, Fontenay-Trésigny, Saint-Germain-Laxis, Château de Vaux-le-Vicomte	
Île-de-France	Seine-et-Marne	16 : Châtillon-la-Borde	Melun, Provins, Nangis, Le Châtelet-en-Brie, Châtillon-la-Borde	
Île-de-France	Seine-et-Marne	Aire des Jonchets-La Grande Paroisee (Eastbound); Aire des Jonchets-Les Récompenses (Westbound)		
Île-de-France	Seine-et-Marne	17 : Forges	Montereau-Fault-Yonne - centre, Champagne-sur-Seine, Nangis, Forges	
Île-de-France	Seine-et-Marne	18 : Marolles-sur-Seine	Fontainebleau, Montereau-Fault-Yonne - centre, Montereau-Fault-Yonne - Z. I., Bray-sur-Seine, Nogent-sur-Seine, Marolles-sur-Seine	
Île-de-France	Seine-et-Marne	Aire des Rasets (Eastbound); Aire de Gravon (Westbound)		
Bourgogne-Franche-Comté	Yonne	A19 - A5	Orléans (A10), Lyon (A6), Sens	
Bourgogne-Franche-Comté	Yonne	E54 / A 5 becomes E54 / E511 / A 5		
Bourgogne-Franche-Comté	Yonne	Aire de Montand (Eastbound); Aire de Montaphilant (Westbound)		
Bourgogne-Franche-Comté	Yonne	Aire de Villeneuve-l'Archevêque (Eastbound); Aire de Villeneuve-Vauluisant (Westbound)		
Bourgogne-Franche-Comté	Yonne	19 : Vulaines	Nogent-sur-Seine, Saint-Florentin, Romilly-sur-Seine, Aix-en-Othe, Villeneuve-l'Archevêque	
Grand Est	Aube	Aire des Tomelles (Eastbound); Aire des Fontvannes (Westbound)		
Grand Est	Aube	20 : Torvilliers	Troyes - centre, Sainte-Savine, Romilly-sur-Seine, Aix-en-Othe	
Grand Est	Aube	E54 / E511 / A 5 becomes E54 / A 5		
Grand Est	Aube	Aire de Saint-Pouange (Eastbound); Aire de la Coloterie (Westbound)		
Grand Est	Aube	21 : Saint Thibault	Auxerre, Troyes - centre, sud, Tonnerre, Saint-Julien-les-Villas, Saint-Thibault	
Grand Est	Aube	A26 - A5	Lille (A1), Metz, Reims (A4), Châlons-en-Champagne, Saint-Dizier, Troyes - est	
Grand Est	Aube	E17 / E54 / A 5 becomes E17 / E54 / A 5		
Grand Est	Aube	Aire de Troyes-Fresnoy (Eastbound); Aire de Troyes-Le-Plessis (Westbound)		
Grand Est	Aube	22 : Magnant	Châtillon-sur-Seine, Bar-sur-Seine, Brienne-le-Château, Bar-sur-Aube, Vendeuvre-sur-Barse, Forêt d'Orient	
Grand Est	Aube	Aire de Mondeville (Eastbound); Aire de Champignol (Westbound)		
Grand Est	Aube	23 : Ville-sous-la-Ferté	Châteauvillain, Colombey les Deux Églises, Châtillon-sur-Seine, Bar-sur-Aube	
Grand Est	Haute-Marne	Aire de Châteauvillain-Val-Marnay (Eastbound); Aire de Châteauvillain-Orges (Westbound)		
Grand Est	Haute-Marne	24 : Chaumont-Semoutiers	Saint-Dizier, Chaumont, Arc-en-Barrois, Semoutiers-Montsaon, Châteauvillain	
Grand Est	Haute-Marne	Aire de Bois-Moyen (Eastbound); Aire de Champs-à-la-Croix (Westbound)		
Grand Est	Haute-Marne	A31 - A5	Metz, Nancy, Vesoul, Langres, Lyon (A6), Dijon, Besançon (A39)	
1.000 mi = 1.609 km; 1.000 km = 0.621 mi

=== A105 (A5b) ===
Region	Department	Junction	Destinations
Île-de-France	Seine-et-Marne	RN 104 - A105	A4, Marne-la-Vallée, Lille (A1) Brie-Comte-Robert, A6, Bordeaux (A10), Évry-Courcouronnes, Corbeil-Essonnes, Carré Sénart, Savigny-le-Temple, Lieusaint, Combs-la-Ville, Parc de PariSud,
Île-de-France	Seine-et-Marne	11 : Évry-Grégy-sur-Yerre	Évry-Grégy-sur-Yerre
Île-de-France	Seine-et-Marne	12 : Moissy-Cramayel	Provins, Moissy-Cramayel, Évry-Grégy-sur-Yerre, Guignes
Île-de-France	Seine-et-Marne	13 : Réau	Réau, Centre aéronautique, Centre routier
Île-de-France	Seine-et-Marne	Aire de Galande-la-Sablière (Southbound); Aire de Galande-La-Mare-Laroche (Northbound)	
Île-de-France	Seine-et-Marne	A5a & A5 - A105	Montereau-Fault-Yonne, Troyes, Lyon
Île-de-France	Seine-et-Marne	14 : Vert-Saint-Denis	Voisenon, Cesson, Vert-Saint-Denis, Pouilly-le-Fort
A 105 becomes N 105
1.000 mi = 1.609 km; 1.000 km = 0.621 mi

== European Routes ==
=== A5 ===
European Route	Location
E54	entire length
E511	A 19 through A 26
E17	A 26 through A 31

=== A105 ===
European Route	Location
E54	entire length
