= Jean-Baptiste-François Pitra =

Catholic cardinal and archaeologist

His Eminence Jean-Baptiste-François Pitra O.S.B.
- Vice-Dean of the College of Cardinals
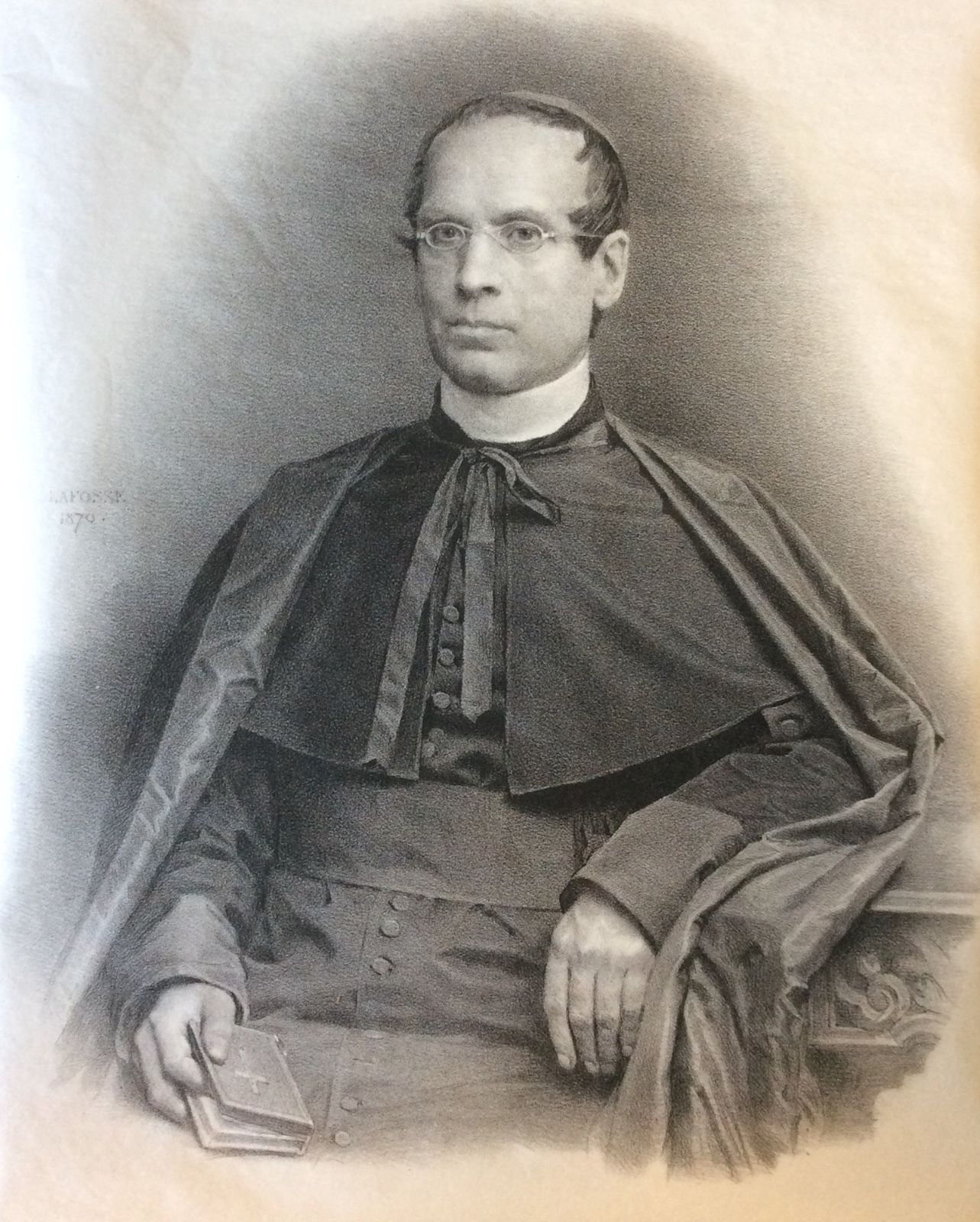
- Pitra in 1871.
- Church: Roman Catholic Church
- Appointed: 24 March 1884
- Term ended: 9 February 1889
- Predecessor: Camillo Di Pietro
- Successor: Luigi Oreglia di Santo Stefano
- Other post: Cardinal-Bishop of Porto e Santa Rufina (1884-89)
- Previous posts: Cardinal-Priest of San Tommaso in Parione (1863–67); Cardinal-Priest of San Callisto (1867–79); Librarian of the Vatican Apostolic Library (1869–75); Archivist of the Vatican Secret Archives (1869–79); Cardinal-Bishop of Frascati (1879–84)

Orders
- Ordination: 13 December 1836 by Bénigne-Urbain-Jean-Marie du Trousset d'Héricourt
- Consecration: 1 June 1879 by Pope Leo XIII
- Created cardinal: 16 March 1863 by Pope Pius IX
- Rank: Cardinal-Priest (1863–79); Cardinal-Bishop (1879–89)

Personal details
- Born: Jean-Baptiste-François Pitra; 1 August 1812 Champforgeuil, First French Empire
- Died: 9 February 1889 (aged 76) San Callisto convent, Rome, Kingdom of Italy
- Parents: Laurent Pitra; Edme-Françoise Vaffier
- Coat of arms

Jean-Baptiste-François Pitra, OSB (French pronunciation: [ʒɑ̃ batist fʁɑ̃swa pitʁa]; 1 August 1812 – 9 February 1889) was a French Catholic cardinal, archaeologist and theologian.

He was born in Champforgeuil. Joining the Benedictine Order, he entered the Abbey of Solesmes in 1842, and was collaborator of Abbe Migne in the latter's Patrologia latina and Patrologia Graeca. He was created cardinal in 1863, and was given the titular church of San Callisto in 1867, before being appointed librarian of the Vatican Library in 1869. He is especially noteworthy for his great archaeological discoveries, including the Inscription of Autun, and is the author of numerous works on archaeological, theological, and historical subjects.

Pitra died in Rome.

== Works ==
- Analecta sacra spicilegio solesmensi parata (in Latin). Vol. 1. Paris. 1876.
  - Analecta sacra spicilegio solesmensi parata (in Latin). Vol. 2. Paris. 1884.
  - Analecta sacra spicilegio solesmensi parata (in Latin). Vol. 4. Paris. 1883.
- Paulin Martin; Jean Baptiste François Pitra (2010). Analecta Sacra Patrum Antenicaenorum ex Codicibus Orientalibus : Syriac and Armenian Fragments of Ante-Nicene Writings. Syriac Studies Library (in Latin and English) (2nd ed.). Piscataway, NJ: Gorgias Press. ISBN 9781463224349. OCLC 1110709933 – via archive.is.
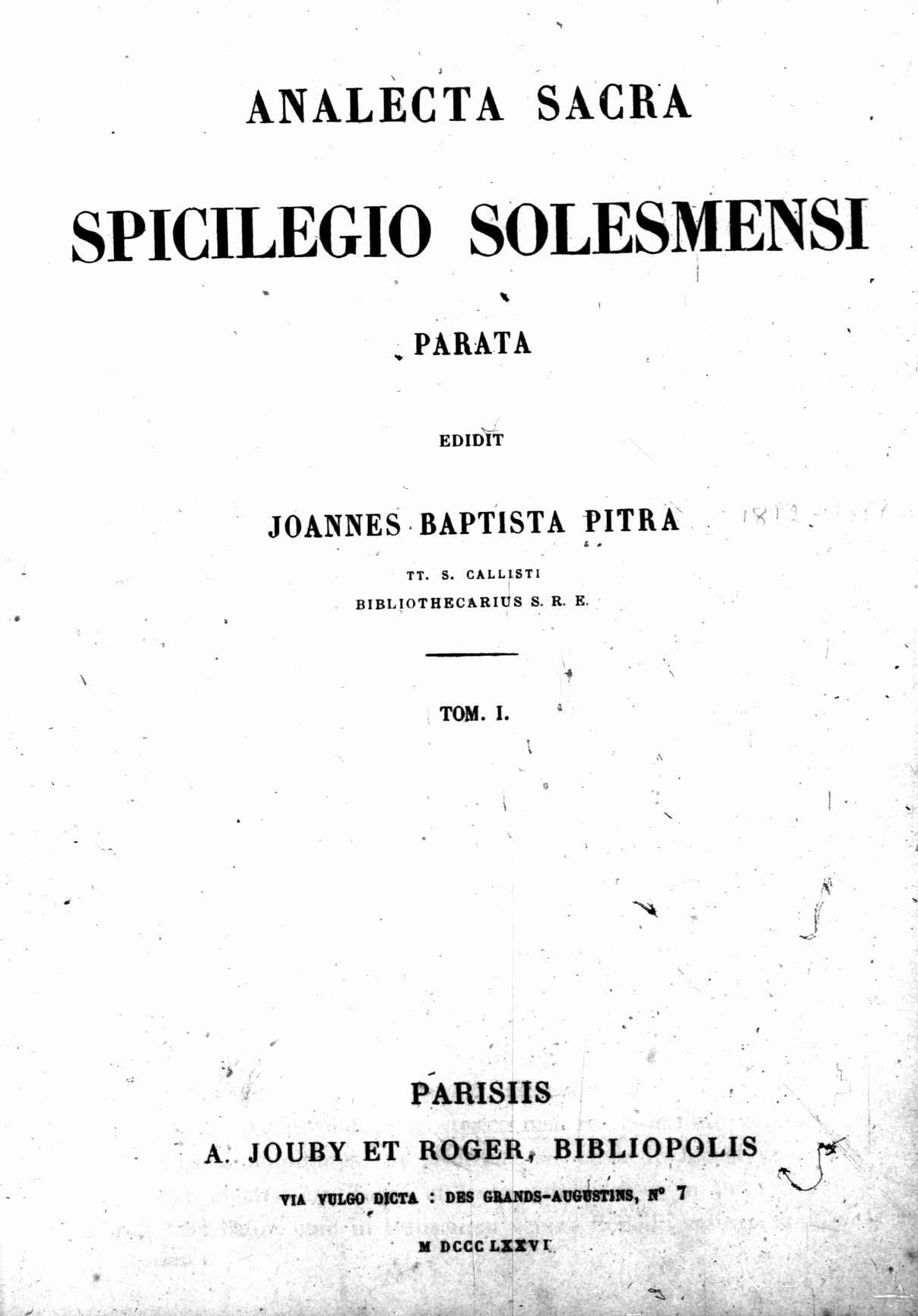
Analecta sacra spicilegio solesmensi parata, 1876

== See also ==
- List of Roman Catholic scientist-clerics
