= Château d'Éguilly =

Coordinates: 47°18′12″N 4°30′15″E

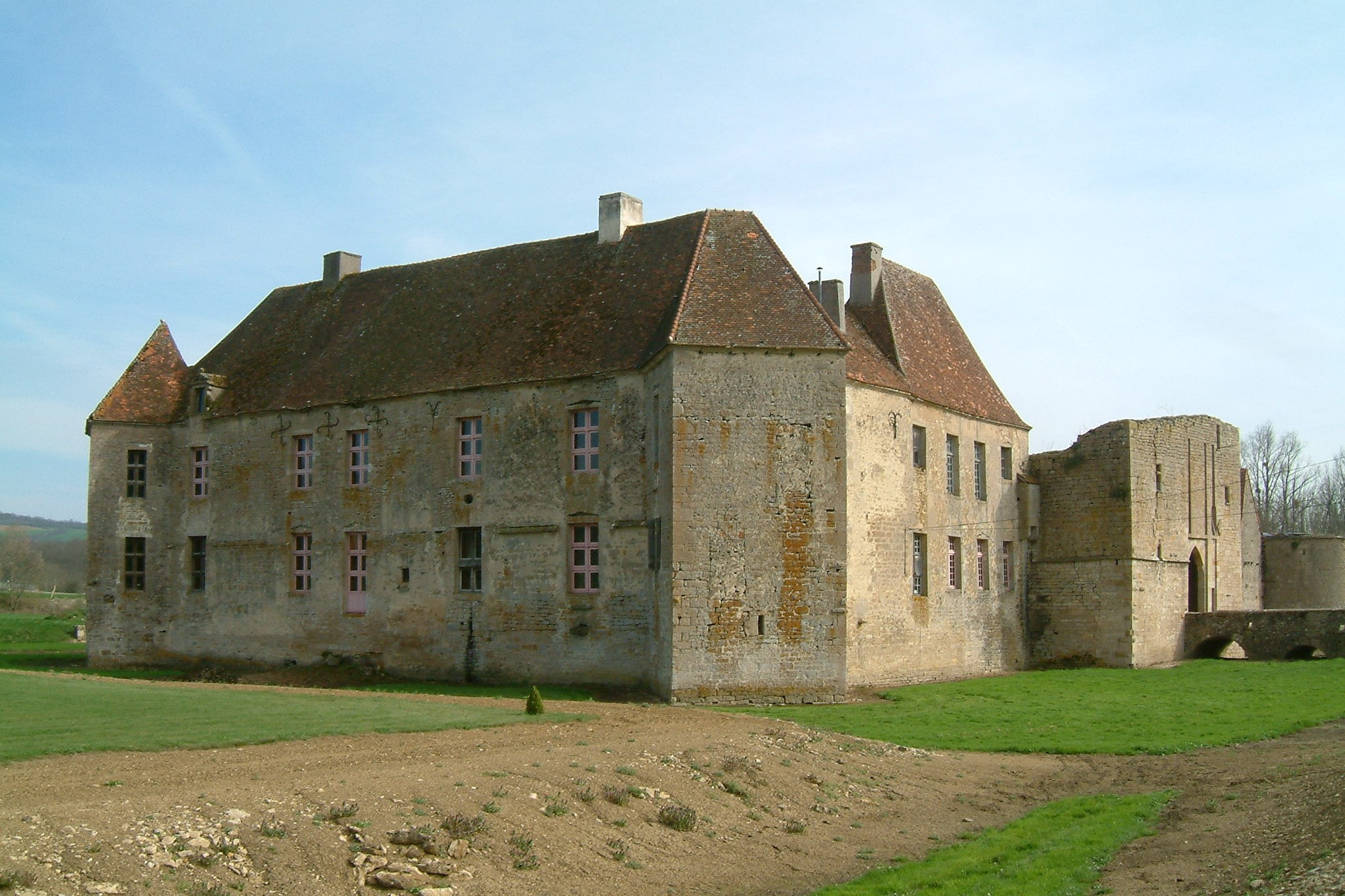
Château d'Éguilly

The Château d'Éguilly is a castle in the commune of Éguilly in the Côte-d'Or département of France, close to the A6 autoroute. Originating from the 12th century, it is listed as a monument historique by the French Ministry of Culture.

Constructed on the site of a Gallo-Roman castle (a Roman road still crosses the present castle courtyard), the 12th century strongpoint with solid ramparts was gradually altered towards the 15th century to be used as a residence for an archbishop. The courtyard has a Renaissance well and the stables are 17th century.

In 1983, Roger Aubry, a former art dealer, and his wife Françoise bought the abandoned castle. Now restored, it has become an international centre for modern and contemporary art, where more than 200 works are shown in a 700 m^{2} exhibition space. A selection of world artists is presented here, and conferences, concerts or temporary exhibitions are also regularly organized on the site.

== See also ==
- List of castles in France
