= La Loyère =

Commune in Saône-et-Loire, France

- Part of Fragnes-La Loyère
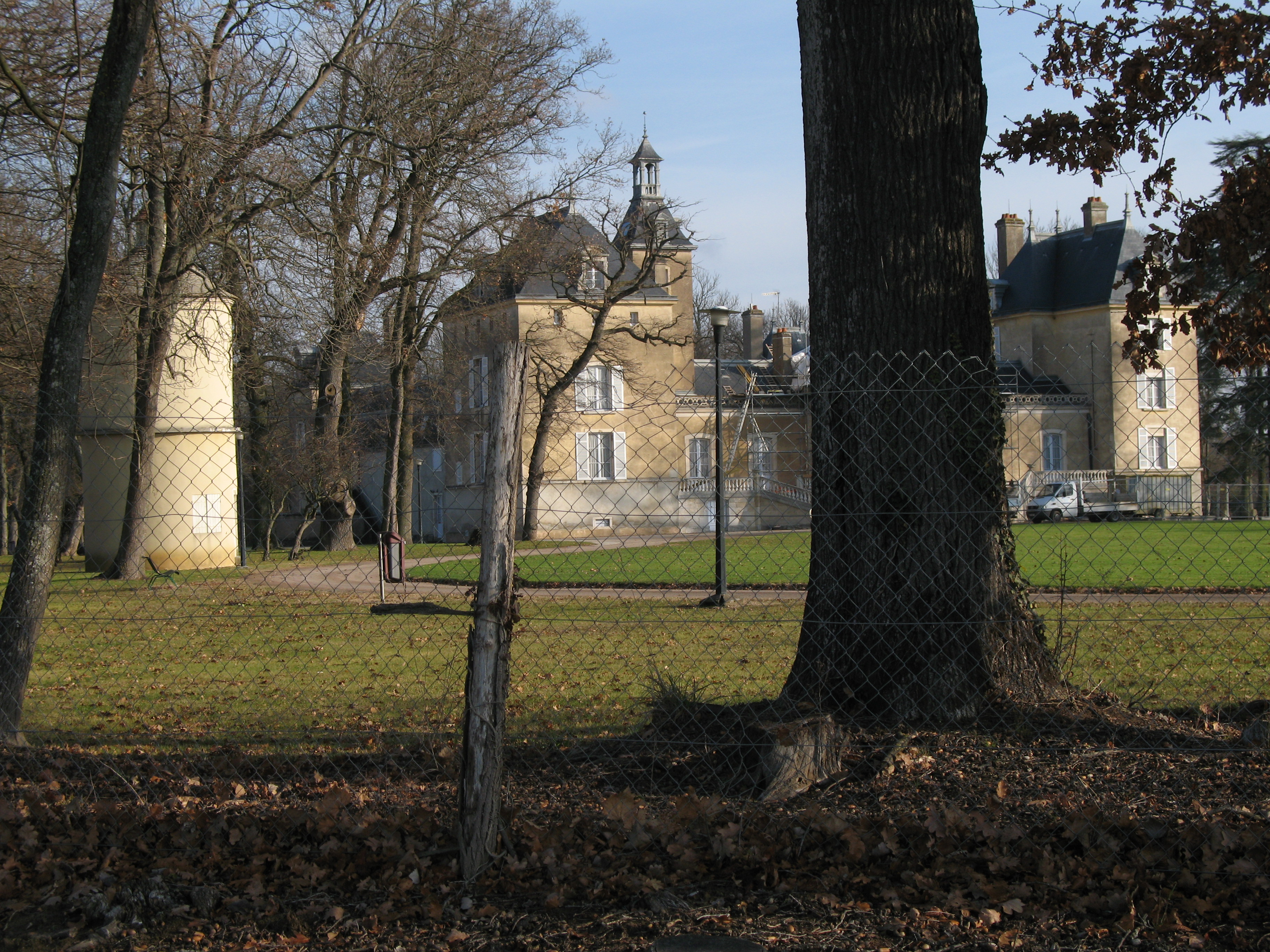
- Chateau
- Location of La Loyère
- Location within France Location within Bourgogne-Franche-Comté
- Coordinates: 46°50′40″N 4°49′46″E
- Country: France
- Region: Bourgogne-Franche-Comté
- Department: Saône-et-Loire
- Arrondissement: Chalon-sur-Saône
- Canton: Chalon-sur-Saône-1
- Commune: Fragnes-La Loyère
- Area^{1}: 5.77 km^{2} (2.23 sq mi)
- Elevation: 183 m (600 ft)
- Highest elevation: 204 m (669 ft)
- Lowest elevation: 177 m (581 ft)
- Population (2013): 436
  - Density: 75.6/km^{2} (196/sq mi)
- Time zone: UTC+01:00 (CET)
  - Summer (DST): UTC+02:00 (CEST)
- Postal code: 71530
- ^{1} French Land Register data, which excludes lakes, ponds, glaciers > 1 km^{2} (0.386 sq mi or 247 acres) and river estuaries.

La Loyère (French pronunciation: [la lwajɛʁ]) is a former commune in the Saône-et-Loire department in the region of Bourgogne-Franche-Comté in eastern France. On 1 January 2016, it was merged into the new commune of Fragnes-La Loyère.

== See also ==
- Communes of the Saône-et-Loire department
