= Virey-le-Grand =

- Commune
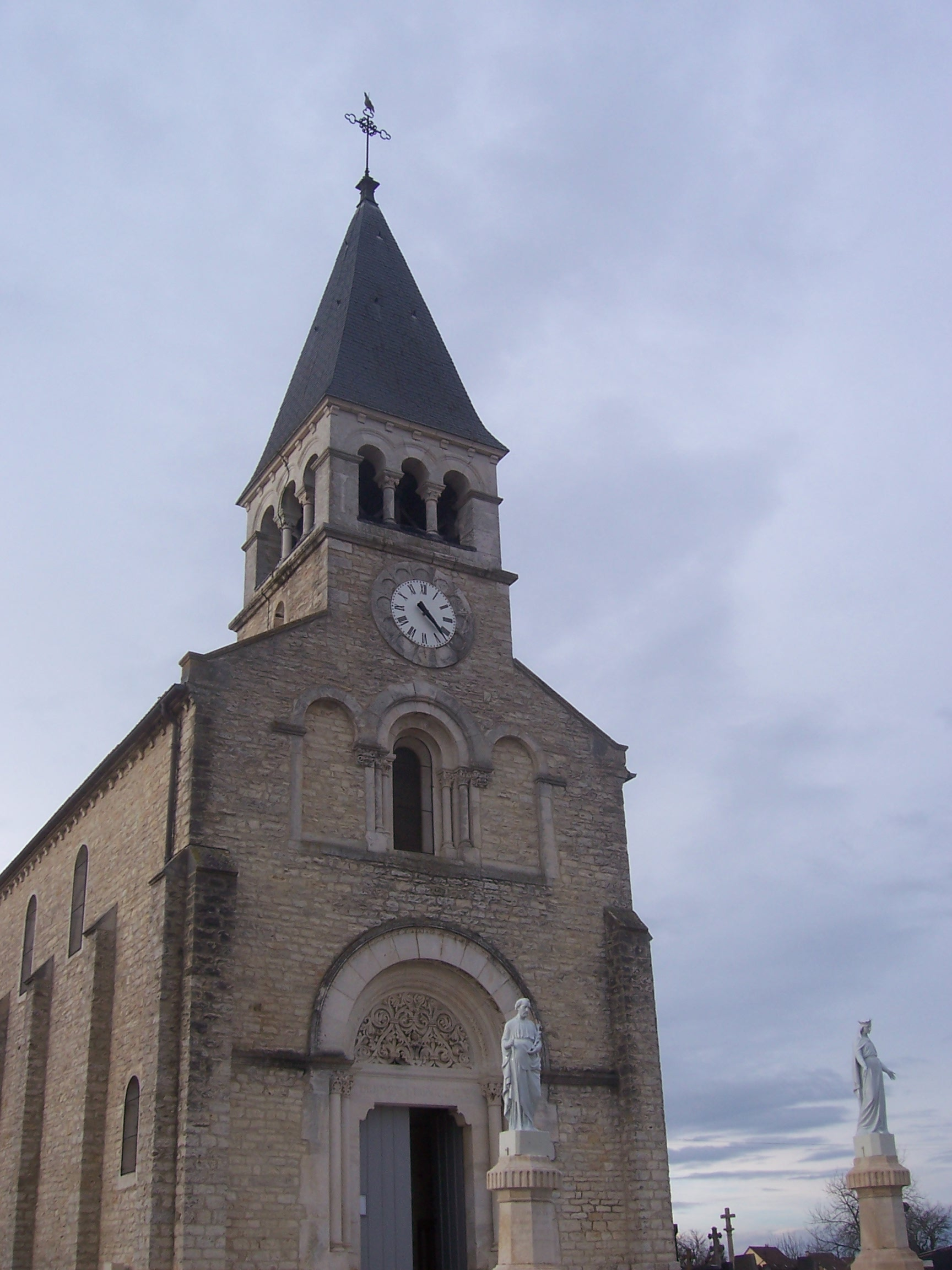
- The church in Virey-le-Grand
- Location of Virey-le-Grand
- Location within France Location within Bourgogne-Franche-Comté
- Coordinates: 46°50′37″N 4°51′59″E
- Country: France
- Region: Bourgogne-Franche-Comté
- Department: Saône-et-Loire
- Arrondissement: Chalon-sur-Saône
- Canton: Chalon-sur-Saône-1
- Intercommunality: CA Le Grand Chalon
- Area^{1}: 12.65 km^{2} (4.88 sq mi)
- Elevation: 190 m (620 ft)
- Highest elevation: 215 m (705 ft)
- Lowest elevation: 178 m (584 ft)
- Population (2023): 1,429
  - Density: 113.0/km^{2} (292.6/sq mi)
- Time zone: UTC+01:00 (CET)
  - Summer (DST): UTC+02:00 (CEST)
- INSEE/Postal code: 71585 /71530
- ^{1} French Land Register data, which excludes lakes, ponds, glaciers > 1 km^{2} (0.386 sq mi or 247 acres) and river estuaries.

Virey-le-Grand (French pronunciation: [viʁɛ lə ɡʁɑ̃], before 1987: Virey) is a commune in the Saône-et-Loire department in the region of Bourgogne-Franche-Comté in eastern France.

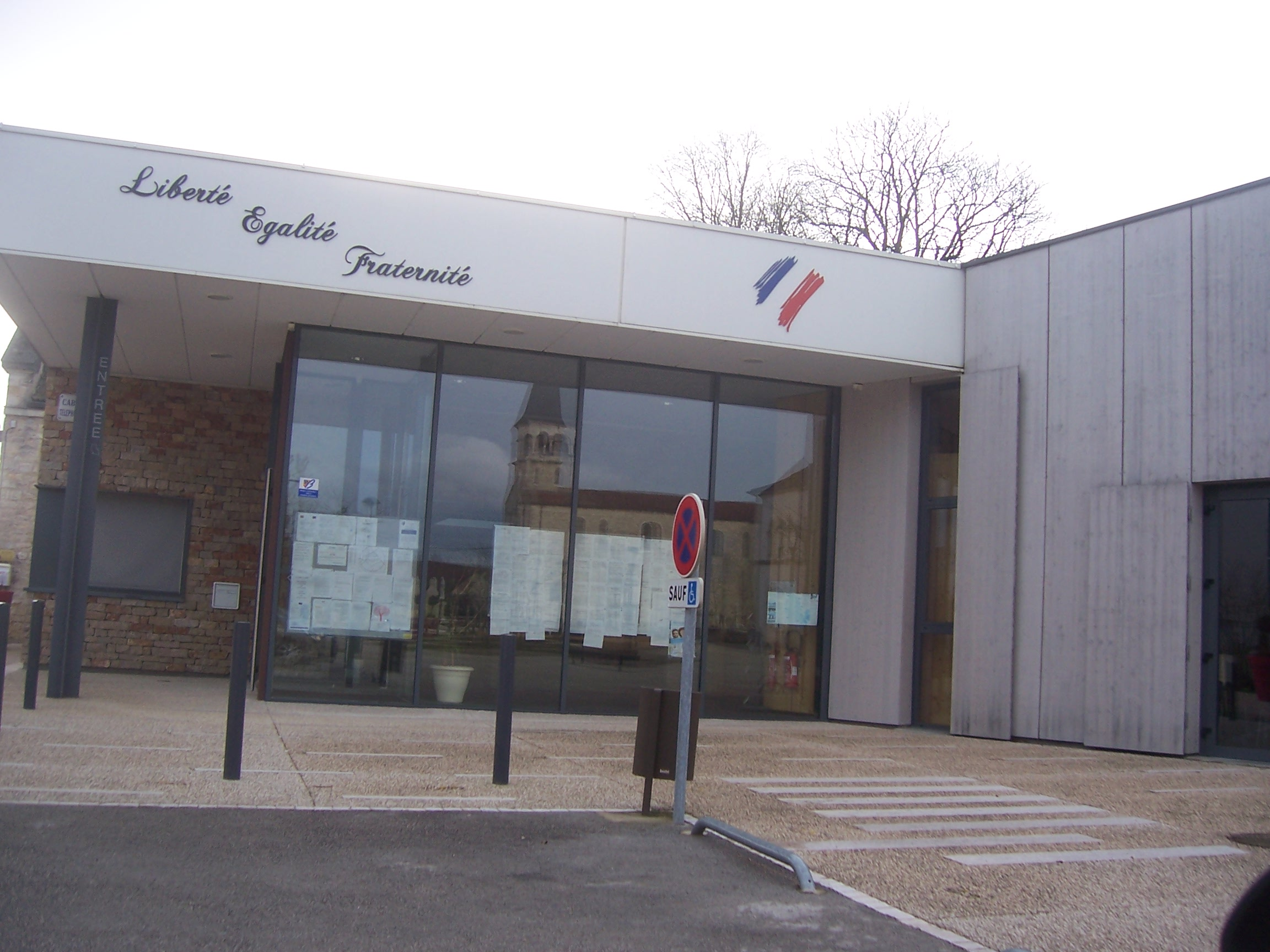
Town hall

== See also ==
- Communes of the Saône-et-Loire department
