= Crissey, Saône-et-Loire =

Crissey
- Commune
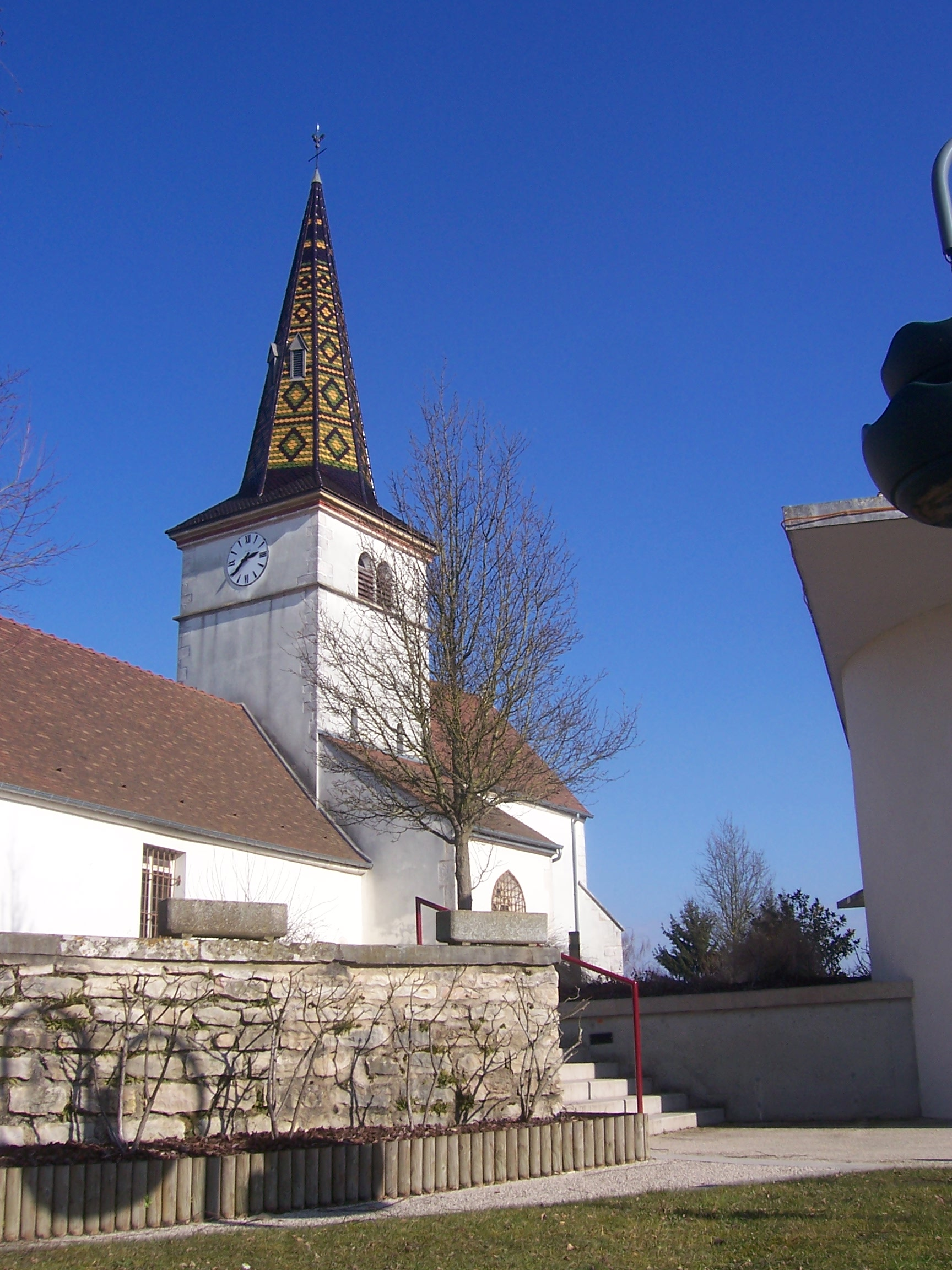
- The church in Crissey

- Coat of arms
- Location of Crissey
- Location within France Location within Bourgogne-Franche-Comté
- Coordinates: 46°49′09″N 4°53′00″E
- Country: France
- Region: Bourgogne-Franche-Comté
- Department: Saône-et-Loire
- Arrondissement: Chalon-sur-Saône
- Canton: Chalon-sur-Saône-1
- Intercommunality: CA Le Grand Chalon

Government
  - Mayor (2022–2026): Pascal Boulling
- Area^{1}: 10.97 km^{2} (4.24 sq mi)
- Elevation: 178 m (584 ft)
- Highest elevation: 191 m (627 ft)
- Lowest elevation: 172 m (564 ft)
- Population (2023): 2,485
  - Density: 226.5/km^{2} (586.7/sq mi)
- Time zone: UTC+01:00 (CET)
  - Summer (DST): UTC+02:00 (CEST)
- INSEE/Postal code: 71154 /71530
- ^{1} French Land Register data, which excludes lakes, ponds, glaciers > 1 km^{2} (0.386 sq mi or 247 acres) and river estuaries.

Crissey (French pronunciation: [kʁisɛ]) is a commune in the Saône-et-Loire department in the region of Bourgogne-Franche-Comté in eastern France.

== Population ==
Historical population

| Year | Pop. | ±% p.a. |
|---|---|---|
| 1793 | 343 | — |
| 1821 | 466 | +1.10% |
| 1846 | 487 | +0.18% |
| 1872 | 494 | +0.05% |
| 1901 | 520 | +0.18% |
| 1926 | 594 | +0.53% |
| 1946 | 607 | +0.11% |
| 1962 | 758 | +1.40% |
| 1968 | 910 | +3.09% |

| Year | Pop. | ±% p.a. |
|---|---|---|
| 1975 | 1,068 | +2.31% |
| 1982 | 1,283 | +2.65% |
| 1990 | 1,514 | +2.09% |
| 1999 | 1,840 | +2.19% |
| 2007 | 2,311 | +2.89% |
| 2012 | 2,491 | +1.51% |
| 2017 | 2,480 | −0.09% |
| 2023 | 2,485 | +0.03% |

Source: EHESS and INSEE (1968-2023)

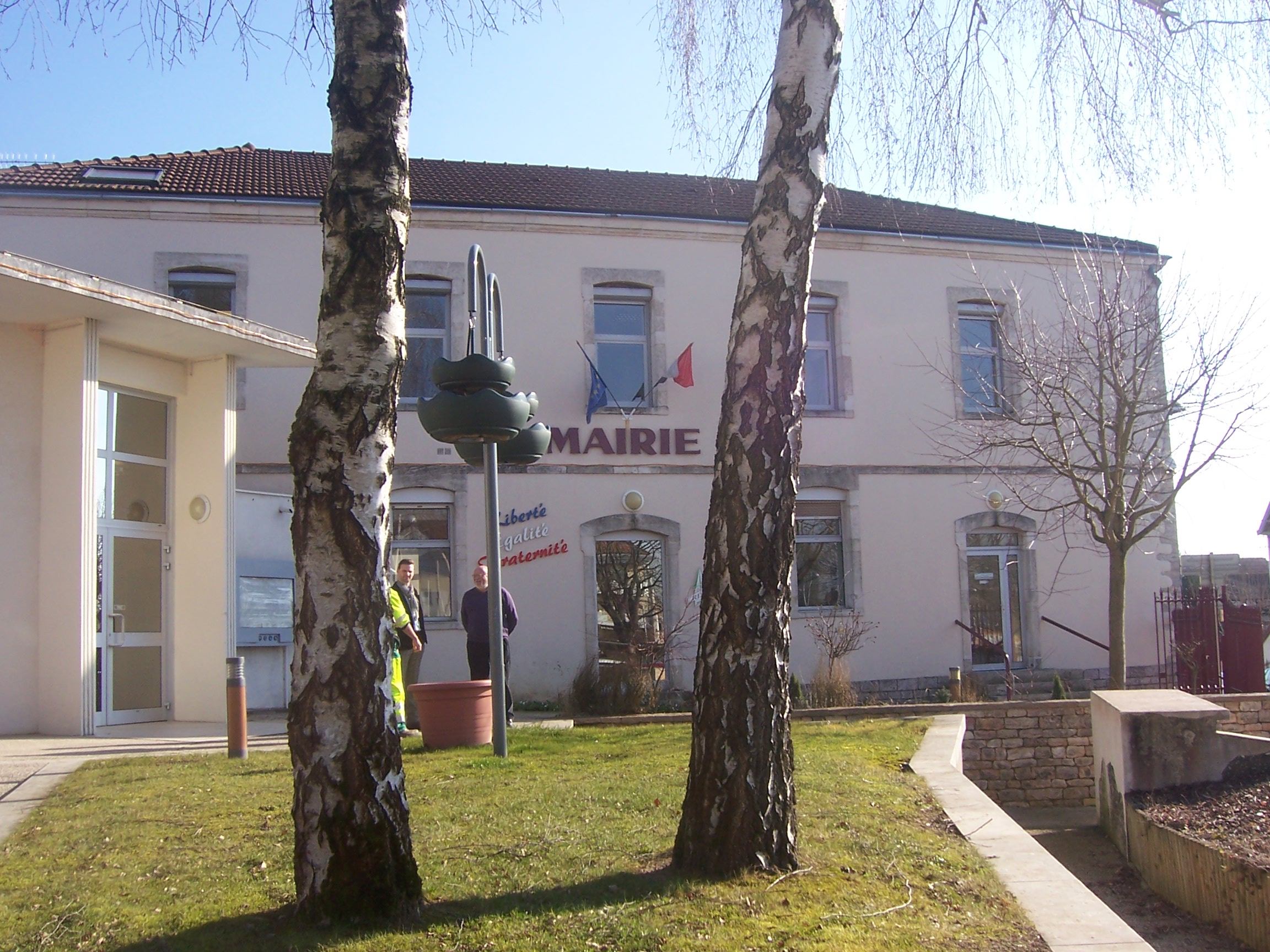
Crissey town hall

== See also ==
- Communes of the Saône-et-Loire department
