= Marcigny-sous-Thil =

- Commune
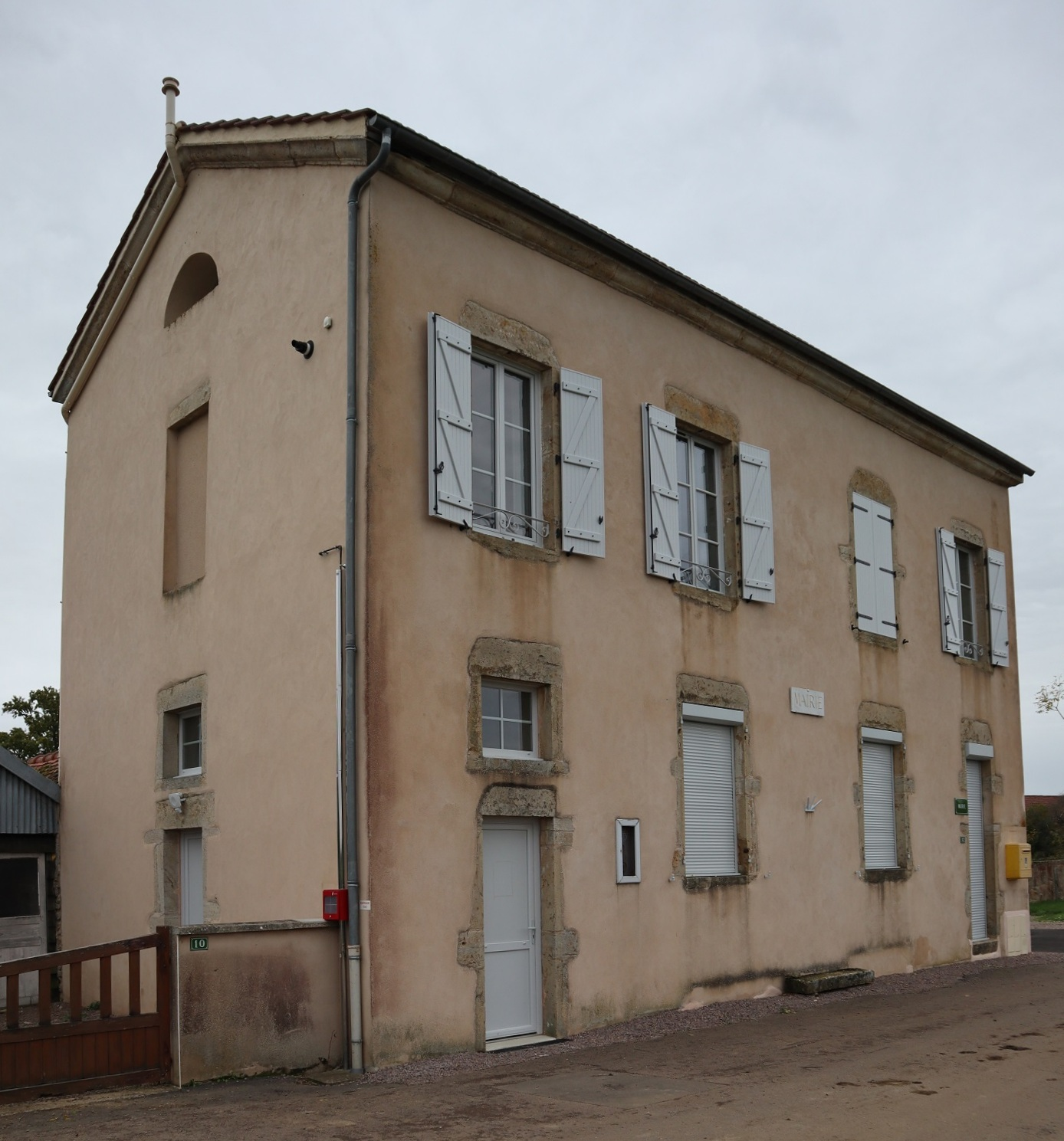
- Marcigny-sous-Thil Town hall
- Location of Marcigny-sous-Thil
- Location within France Location within Bourgogne-Franche-Comté
- Coordinates: 47°23′29″N 4°23′04″E
- Country: France
- Region: Bourgogne-Franche-Comté
- Department: Côte-d'Or
- Arrondissement: Montbard
- Canton: Semur-en-Auxois

Government
  - Mayor (2020–2026): Pascal Barrier
- Area^{1}: 4.97 km^{2} (1.92 sq mi)
- Elevation: 320 m (1,050 ft)
- Highest elevation: 356 m (1,168 ft)
- Lowest elevation: 306 m (1,004 ft)
- Population (2023): 56
  - Density: 11/km^{2} (29/sq mi)
- Time zone: UTC+01:00 (CET)
  - Summer (DST): UTC+02:00 (CEST)
- INSEE/Postal code: 21380 /21390
- ^{1} French Land Register data, which excludes lakes, ponds, glaciers > 1 km^{2} (0.386 sq mi or 247 acres) and river estuaries.

Marcigny-sous-Thil (French pronunciation: [maʁsiɲi su til], literally Marcigny under Thil) is a commune in the Côte-d'Or department in eastern France.

== Population ==
Historical population
Year	Pop.	±% p.a.
1968	67	—
1975	68	+0.21%
1982	65	−0.64%
1990	43	−5.03%
1999	48	+1.23%
2007	58	+2.39%
2012	64	+1.99%
2017	61	−0.96%
2023	56	−1.42%
Source: INSEE

== See also ==
- Communes of the Côte-d'Or department
