= Porte d'Orléans =

City gate in Paris

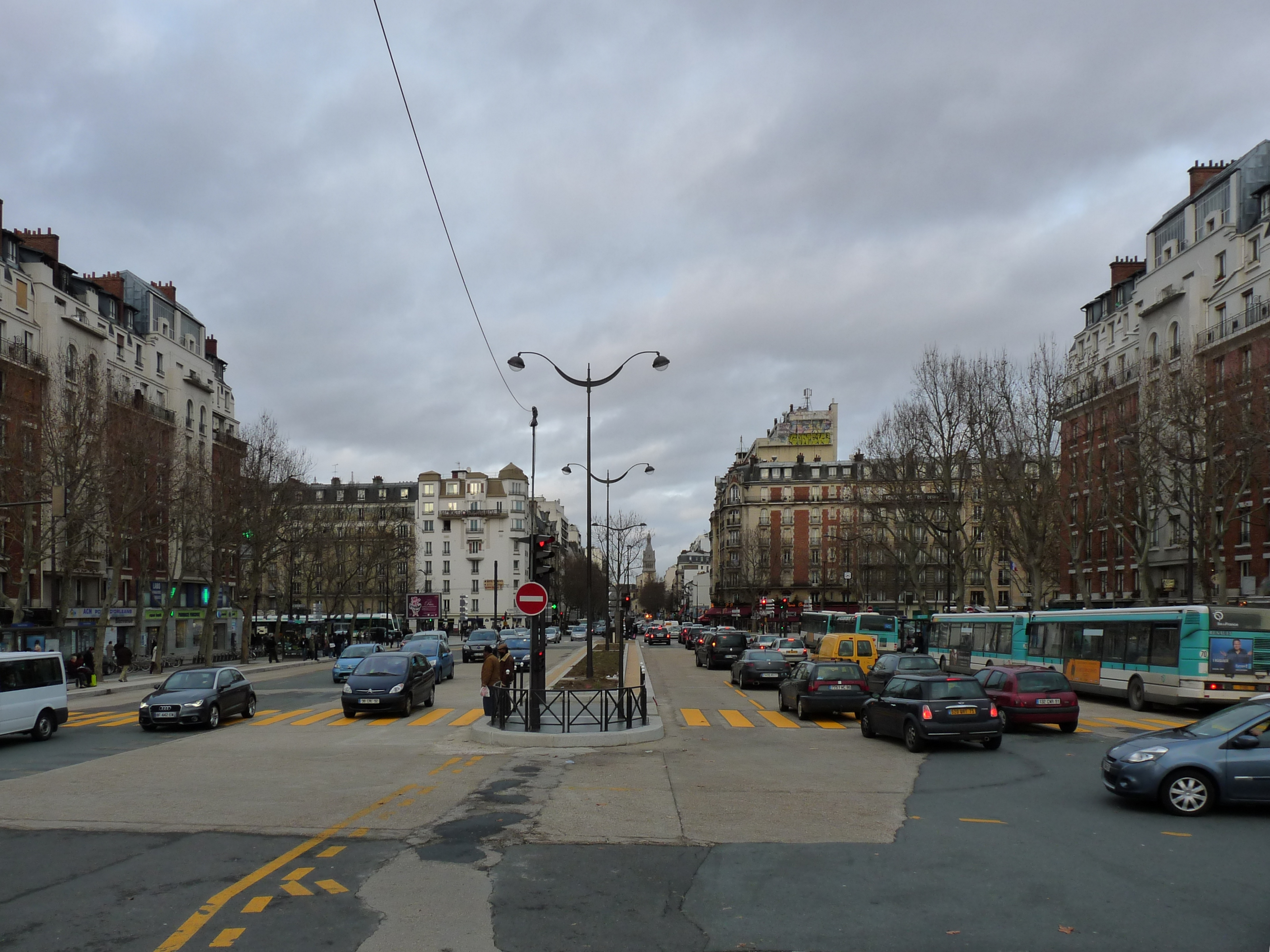
The Porte d'Orléans

The Porte d'Orléans is one of 17 portes (city gates of Paris) in the Thiers wall, a defensive wall constructed in the mid-nineteenth century to protect Paris. The wall was demolished after the First World War, creating an open space that was subsequently built up. The Porte d'Orléans is now one of the main gateways to the capital, and is located in the 14th arrondissement of Paris.

== Location ==
Porte d'Orléans is located around the Place du 25-Aug-1944, at the crossroads to the north of the Avenue du General Leclerc, the Boulevard Brune, and Boulevard Jourdan, and to the south of the intersection of Avenue de la Porte d'Orléans, the Avenue Ernest-Reyer, the Avenue Paul Appell and Rue de la Légion-Étrangère.

== History ==
The Porte d'Orléans owes its name to the fact that the road coming from Orléans, known today as Route nationale 20, led there. This axis was of great importance to the Middle Ages to the cohesion of the emerging monarchy as Paris and Orleans were then the two main cities of the royal domain.

It was through the Porte d'Orléans that elements of General Philippe Leclerc de Hauteclocque's 2e Division Blindée (French 2nd Armored Division) became the first Allied units to enter the capital, on 24 August 1944, thus contributing to the liberation of Paris during World War II. This event was an important step in realizing the oath that Leclerc had done before his men after the Battle of Kufra in 1941, that he would not lay down his arms until the French flag flew once again from the Strasbourg Cathedral. The Oath-of-Kufra Square, situated on the west side of the Porte d'Orléans between the Avenue de la Porte d'Orléans and Rue de la Légion Étrangère commemorates this episode.

== Transportation ==
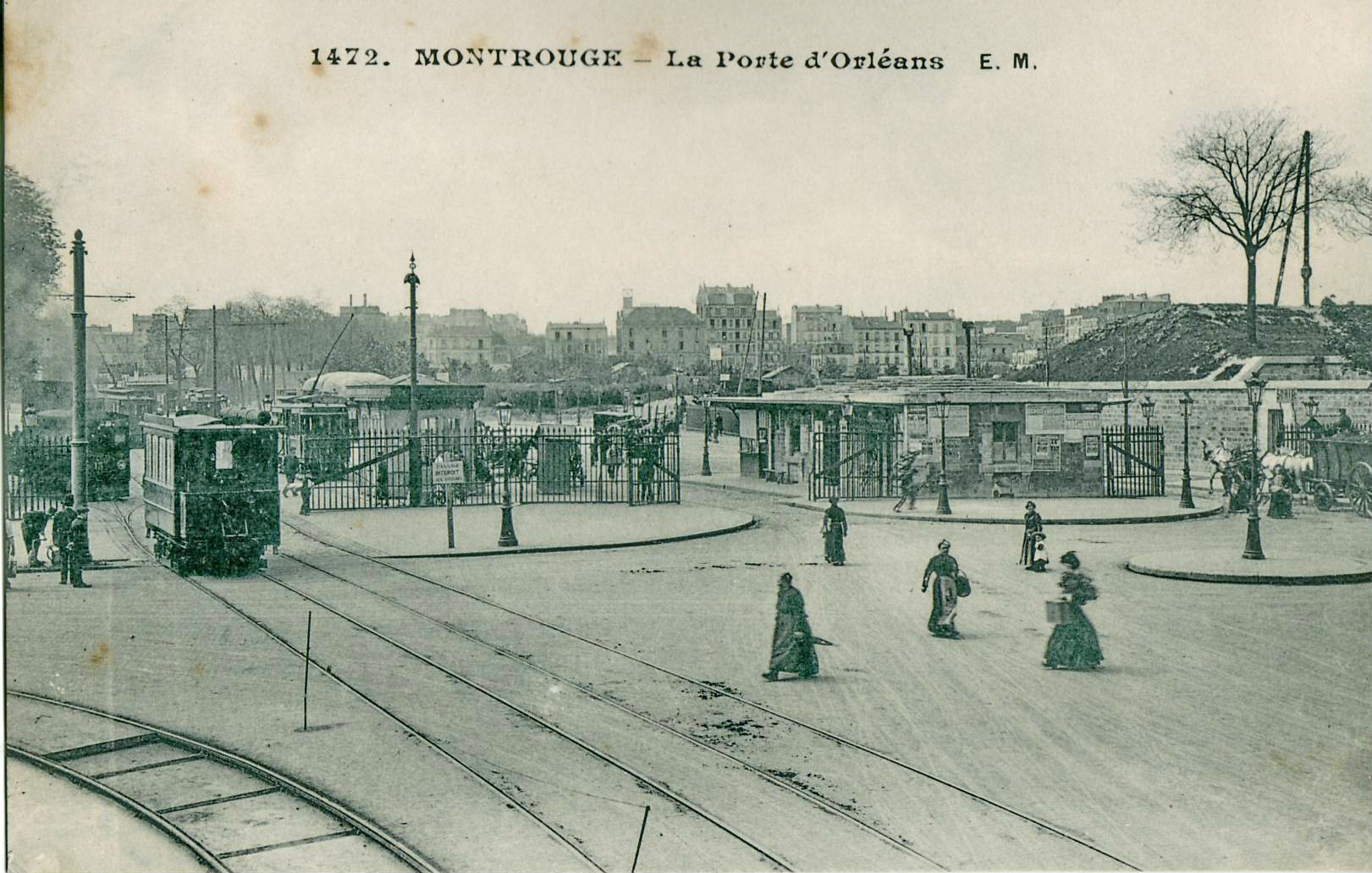
The Porte d'Orleans in the early twentieth century was already a transportation hub. From 1893 to 1937, the Arpajonnais, a meter gauge passengers line ran to Les Halles in Paris.

The Porte d'Orléans is an important hub for road and rail public transport. It is the starting point of the current National Highway 20 which connects Paris to the border Spanish, via Orleans, Toulouse and Bourg-Madame.

The traffic is very important, it is one of the main gates of Paris to the south, with the Porte d'Italie and the Porte de Saint-Cloud.

Furthermore, the axis ex-RN 20 - Avenue du General Leclerc is both a principal axis for the Police Headquarters (presidential and prison convoys), but also one of two entry points south of Paris (with the Porte d'Italie) for abnormal loads (the OCL - LAC - the tram is also 50 cm lift for trucks high template).

A half-exchanger allows access to ring road to the west. On one side is an interchange marks the beginning of the highway A6a to Lyon and an access to A10 which leads to Bordeaux and Nantes.

The Porte d'Orléans used to be the terminus of metro line 4 (before its extension to Montrouge in 2012). It is also served by the tramway T3. Two bus stations provide the terminus for many bus lines: north, along the Avenue du General Leclerc, leaving the bus depot, there are lines RATP 28 and 38 to Paris intramural, south, the square of 25 August 1944, many lines of suburbs: RATP 68 125 126 128 187 188 194 197 295 297 299; SQYBUS 475, Vtmois 96, Daniel Mayer 151 and 152 CEAT 20, 21 and 07.
