= Crottes-en-Pithiverais =

- Commune
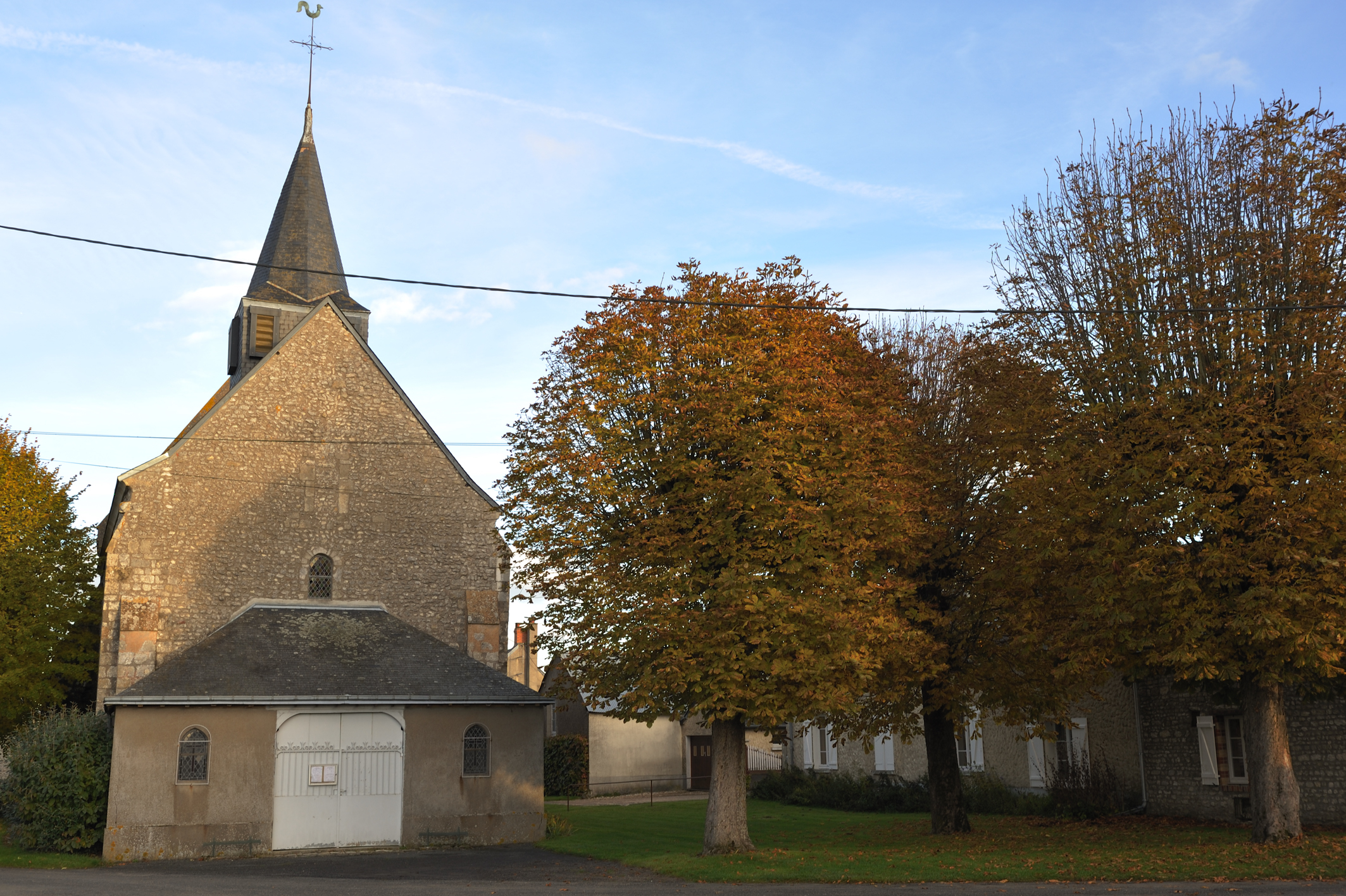
- The church in Crottes-en-Pithiverais

- Coat of arms
- Location of Crottes-en-Pithiverais
- Location within France Location within Centre-Val de Loire
- Coordinates: 48°07′30″N 2°04′00″E
- Country: France
- Region: Centre-Val de Loire
- Department: Loiret
- Arrondissement: Pithiviers
- Canton: Pithiviers
- Intercommunality: CC Plaine du Nord Loiret

Government
  - Mayor (2020–2026): Daniel Poincloux
- Area^{1}: 13.65 km^{2} (5.27 sq mi)
- Highest elevation: 137 m (449 ft)
- Lowest elevation: 122 m (400 ft)
- Population (2023): 321
  - Density: 23.5/km^{2} (60.9/sq mi)
- Demonym: Crottois
- Time zone: UTC+01:00 (CET)
  - Summer (DST): UTC+02:00 (CEST)
- INSEE/Postal code: 45118 /45170
- ^{1} French Land Register data, which excludes lakes, ponds, glaciers > 1 km^{2} (0.386 sq mi or 247 acres) and river estuaries.

Crottes-en-Pithiverais (French pronunciation: [kʁɔt ɑ̃ pitivʁɛ]) is a commune in the Loiret department in north-central France. In January 1973 it absorbed the former commune Teillay-Saint-Benoist.

== See also ==
- Communes of the Loiret department
