= Les Chères =

- Commune
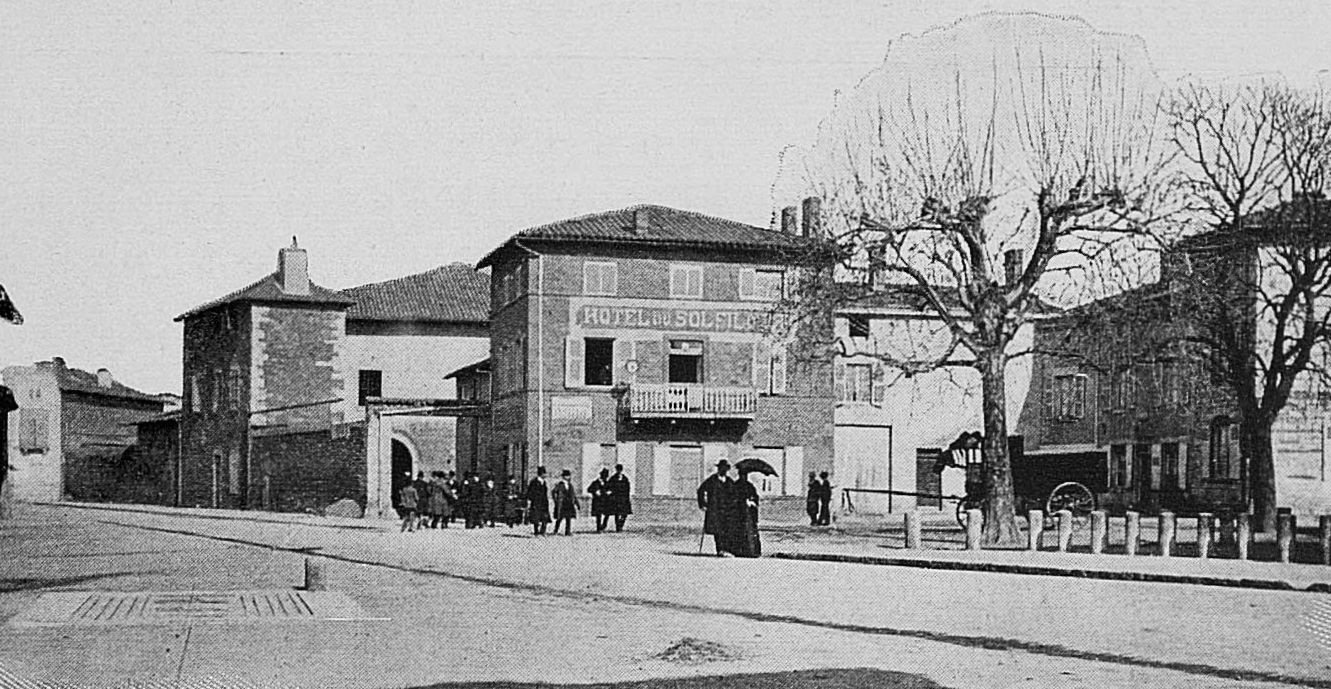
- A view within Les Chères, at the beginning of the 20th century

- Coat of arms
- Location of Les Chères
- Location within France Location within Auvergne-Rhône-Alpes
- Coordinates: 45°53′25″N 4°44′36″E
- Country: France
- Region: Auvergne-Rhône-Alpes
- Department: Rhône
- Arrondissement: Villefranche-sur-Saône
- Canton: Anse
- Intercommunality: CC Beaujolais Pierres Dorées

Government
  - Mayor (2020–2026): Alix Adamo
- Area^{1}: 5.46 km^{2} (2.11 sq mi)
- Elevation: 210 m (690 ft)
- Highest elevation: 212 m (696 ft)
- Lowest elevation: 176 m (577 ft)
- Population (2023): 1,503
  - Density: 275/km^{2} (713/sq mi)
- Time zone: UTC+01:00 (CET)
  - Summer (DST): UTC+02:00 (CEST)
- INSEE/Postal code: 69055 /69380
- ^{1} French Land Register data, which excludes lakes, ponds, glaciers > 1 km^{2} (0.386 sq mi or 247 acres) and river estuaries.

Les Chères (French pronunciation: [le ʃɛʁ]) is a commune in the Rhône department in eastern France.

== Demography ==
Historical population
Year	Pop.	±% p.a.
1968	617	—
1975	756	+2.94%
1982	814	+1.06%
1990	1,027	+2.95%
1999	1,073	+0.49%
2007	1,235	+1.77%
2012	1,430	+2.98%
2017	1,453	+0.32%
2023	1,503	+0.57%
Source: INSEE

== See also ==
Communes of the Rhône department
