= Fragnes-La Loyère =

- Commune
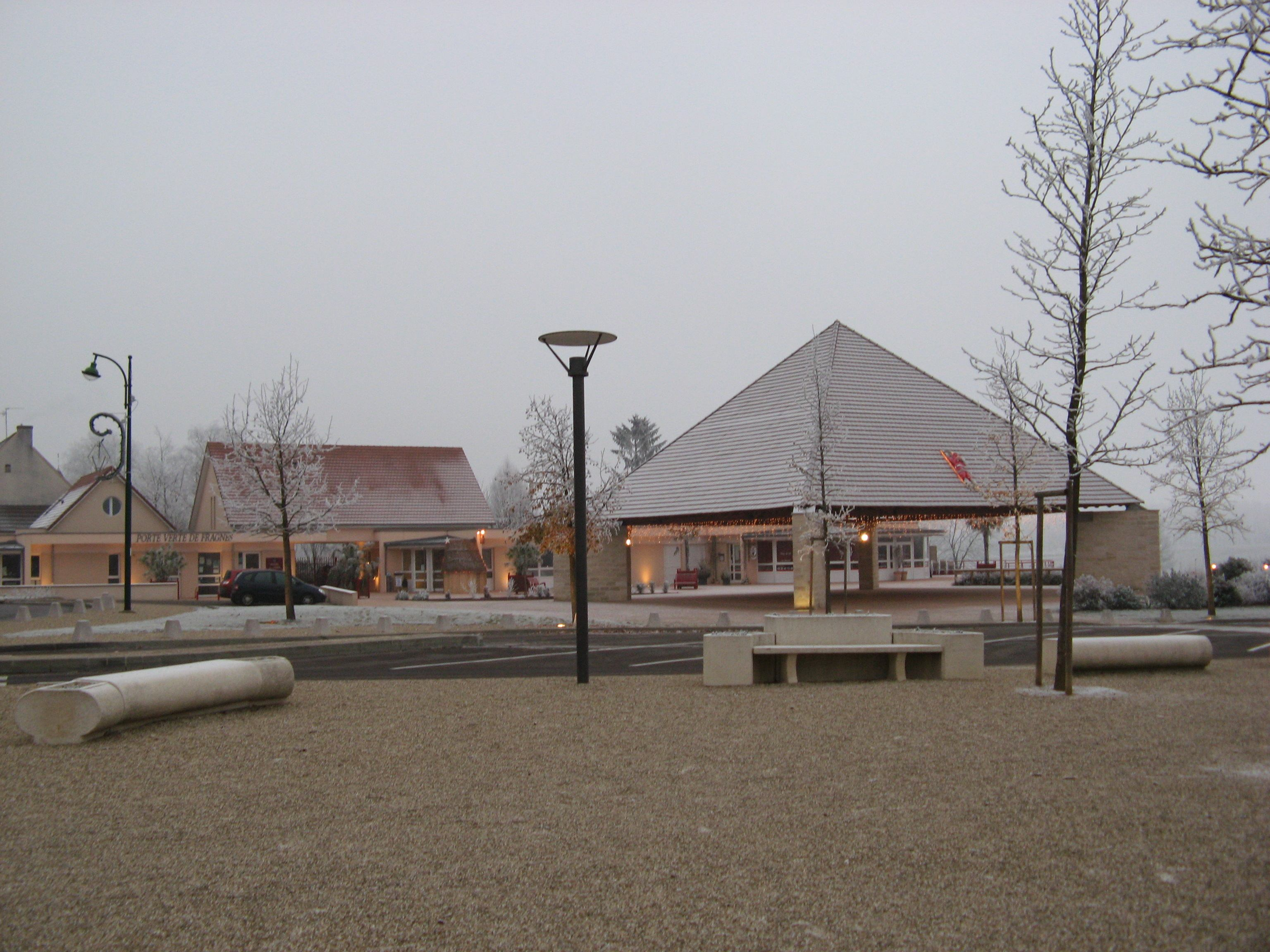
- The town centre in Fragnes-La Loyère
- Location of Fragnes-La Loyère
- Location within France Location within Bourgogne-Franche-Comté
- Coordinates: 46°50′06″N 4°50′31″E
- Country: France
- Region: Bourgogne-Franche-Comté
- Department: Saône-et-Loire
- Arrondissement: Chalon-sur-Saône
- Canton: Chalon-sur-Saône-1
- Intercommunality: CA Le Grand Chalon

Government
  - Mayor (2023–2026): Laurence Malon
- Area^{1}: 9.63 km^{2} (3.72 sq mi)
- Population (2023): 1,411
  - Density: 147/km^{2} (379/sq mi)
- Time zone: UTC+01:00 (CET)
  - Summer (DST): UTC+02:00 (CEST)
- INSEE/Postal code: 71204 /71530
- ^{1} French Land Register data, which excludes lakes, ponds, glaciers > 1 km^{2} (0.386 sq mi or 247 acres) and river estuaries.

Fragnes-La Loyère (French pronunciation: [fʁaɲ la lwajɛʁ]) is a commune in the Saône-et-Loire department of eastern France. The municipality was established on 1 January 2016 and consists of the former communes of Fragnes and La Loyère.

== See also ==
- Communes of the Saône-et-Loire department
