= Farges-lès-Chalon =

- Commune
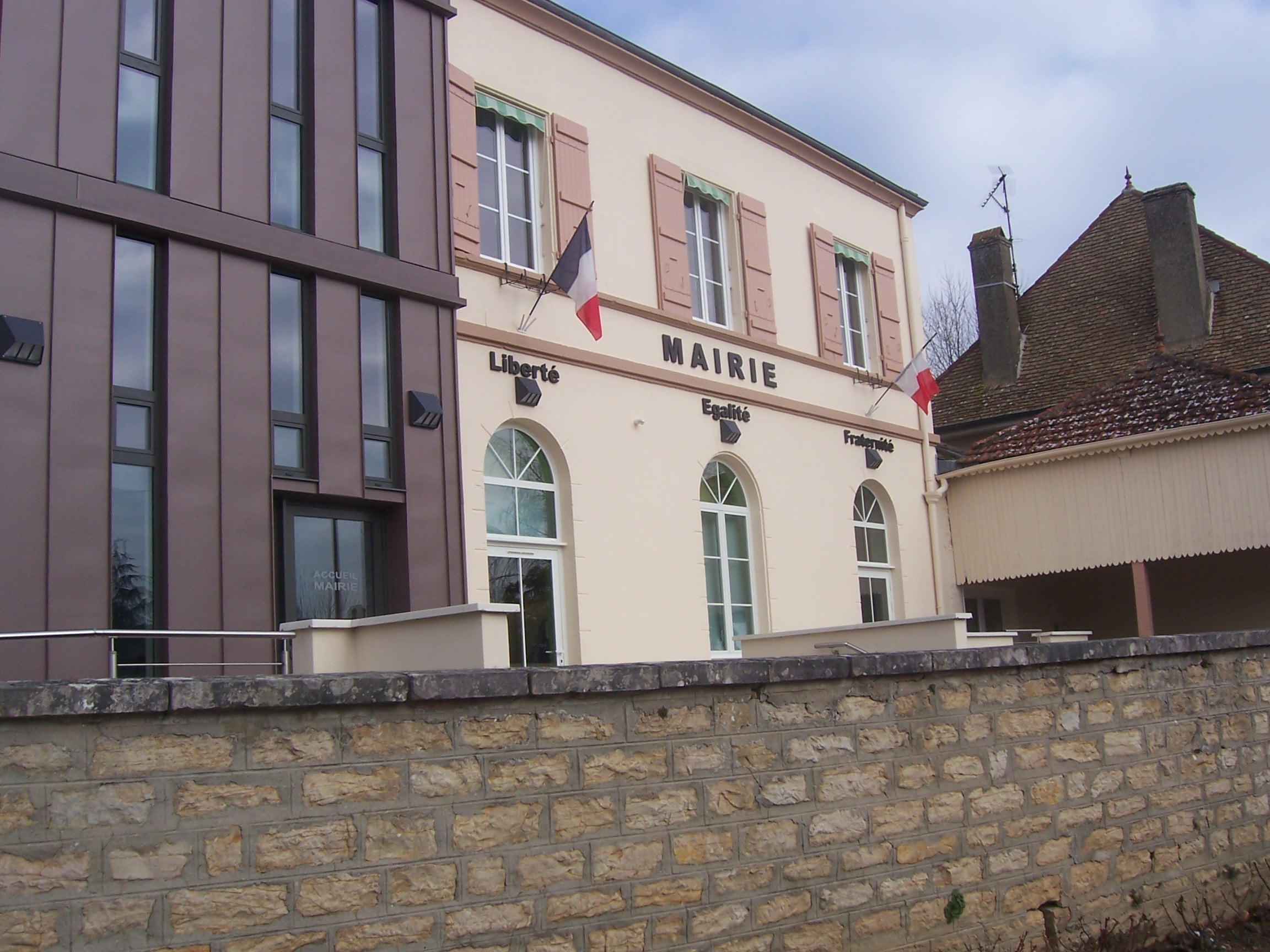
- Town hall
- Location of Farges-lès-Chalon
- Location within France Location within Bourgogne-Franche-Comté
- Coordinates: 46°50′03″N 4°48′25″E
- Country: France
- Region: Bourgogne-Franche-Comté
- Department: Saône-et-Loire
- Arrondissement: Chalon-sur-Saône
- Canton: Chalon-sur-Saône-1
- Intercommunality: CA Le Grand Chalon

Government
  - Mayor (2020–2026): Sylvain Dumas
- Area^{1}: 3.94 km^{2} (1.52 sq mi)
- Elevation: 200 m (660 ft)
- Highest elevation: 204 m (669 ft)
- Lowest elevation: 183 m (600 ft)
- Population (2023): 829
  - Density: 210/km^{2} (545/sq mi)
- Time zone: UTC+01:00 (CET)
  - Summer (DST): UTC+02:00 (CEST)
- INSEE/Postal code: 71194 /71150
- ^{1} French Land Register data, which excludes lakes, ponds, glaciers > 1 km^{2} (0.386 sq mi or 247 acres) and river estuaries.

Farges-lès-Chalon (French pronunciation: [faʁʒ lɛ ʃalɔ̃], literally Farges near Chalon) is a commune in the Saône-et-Loire department in the region of Bourgogne-Franche-Comté in eastern France.

== See also ==
- Communes of the Saône-et-Loire department
