= Canton of Chalon-sur-Saône-1 =

Coordinates: 46.81°N 4.85°E

The canton of Chalon-sur-Saône-1 is an administrative division of the Saône-et-Loire department, eastern France. It was created at the French canton reorganisation which came into effect in March 2015. Its seat is in Chalon-sur-Saône.

It consists of the following communes:

1. Chalon-sur-Saône (partly)
2. Champforgeuil
3. Crissey
4. Farges-lès-Chalon
5. Fragnes-la-Loyère
6. Virey-le-Grand
