= Champforgeuil =

- Commune
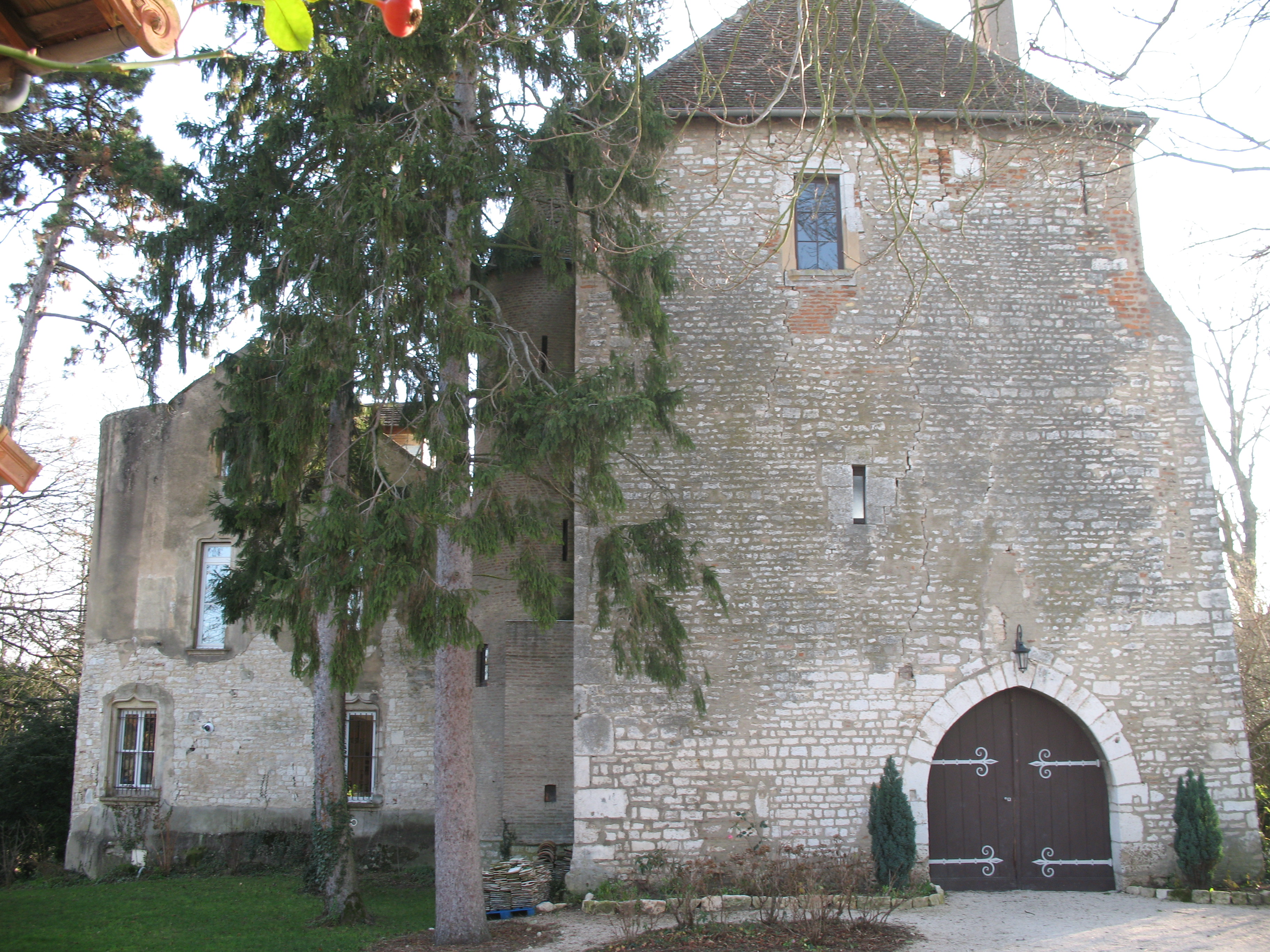
- The chateau in Champforgeuil
- Location of Champforgeuil
- Location within France Location within Bourgogne-Franche-Comté
- Coordinates: 46°49′13″N 4°50′06″E
- Country: France
- Region: Bourgogne-Franche-Comté
- Department: Saône-et-Loire
- Arrondissement: Chalon-sur-Saône
- Canton: Chalon-sur-Saône-1
- Intercommunality: CA Le Grand Chalon
- Area^{1}: 7.29 km^{2} (2.81 sq mi)
- Elevation: 190 m (620 ft)
- Highest elevation: 201 m (659 ft)
- Lowest elevation: 174 m (571 ft)
- Population (2023): 2,637
  - Density: 362/km^{2} (937/sq mi)
- Time zone: UTC+01:00 (CET)
  - Summer (DST): UTC+02:00 (CEST)
- INSEE/Postal code: 71081 /71530
- ^{1} French Land Register data, which excludes lakes, ponds, glaciers > 1 km^{2} (0.386 sq mi or 247 acres) and river estuaries.

Champforgeuil (French pronunciation: [ʃɑ̃fɔʁʒœj]) is a commune in the Saône-et-Loire department in the region of Bourgogne-Franche-Comté in eastern France. It is a northern suburb of Chalon-sur-Saône.

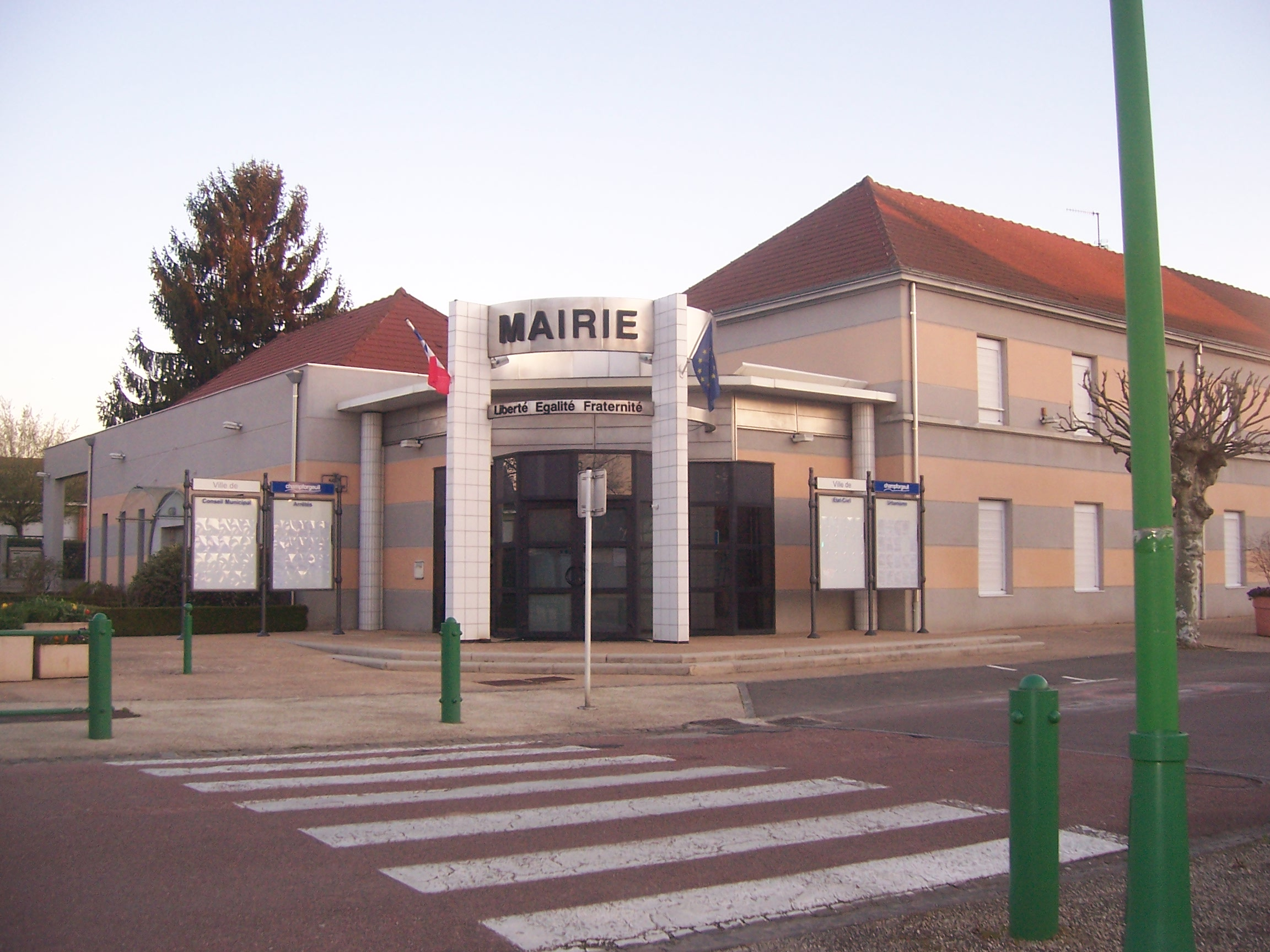
Town hall

== Population ==
Historical population
Year	Pop.	±% p.a.
1968	1,213	—
1975	1,923	+6.80%
1982	2,125	+1.44%
1990	2,128	+0.02%
1999	2,185	+0.29%
2007	2,269	+0.47%
2012	2,374	+0.91%
2017	2,534	+1.31%
2023	2,637	+0.67%
Source: INSEE

== See also ==
- Communes of the Saône-et-Loire department
