= European route E511 =

Road in trans-European E-road network

E511

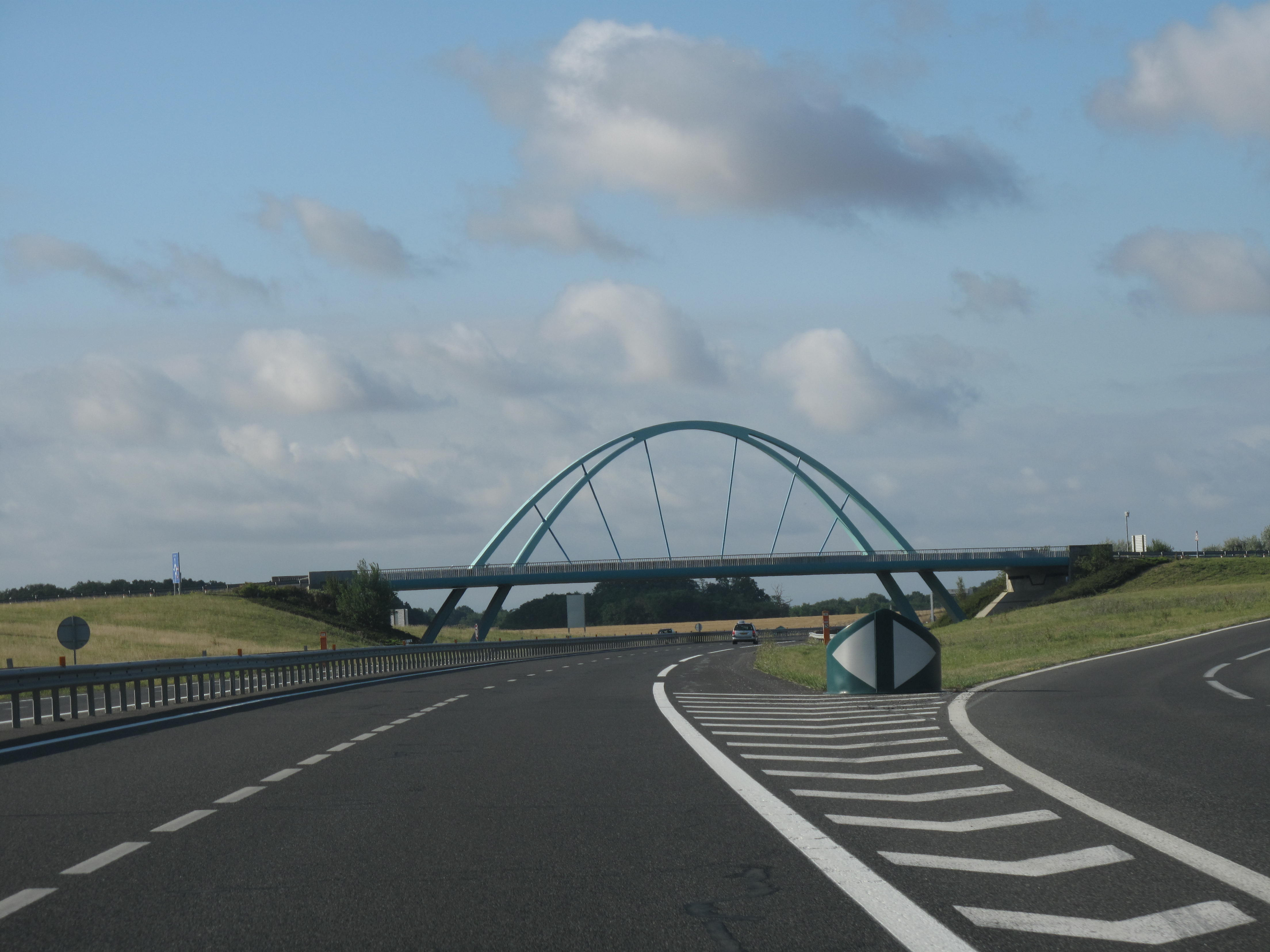
- Rest stop with crossover on E511, near Villeroy

Route information
- Length: 101 km (63 mi)

Major junctions
- From: Courtenay
- To: Troyes

Location
- Countries: France

Highway system
- International E-road network; A Class; B Class

E 511 is a European B class road in France, connecting the cities Courtenay – Troyes.

== Route and E-road junctions ==
- France
  - Courtenay: E60
  - Troyes
