= Villeroy, Yonne =

Villeroy
- Commune
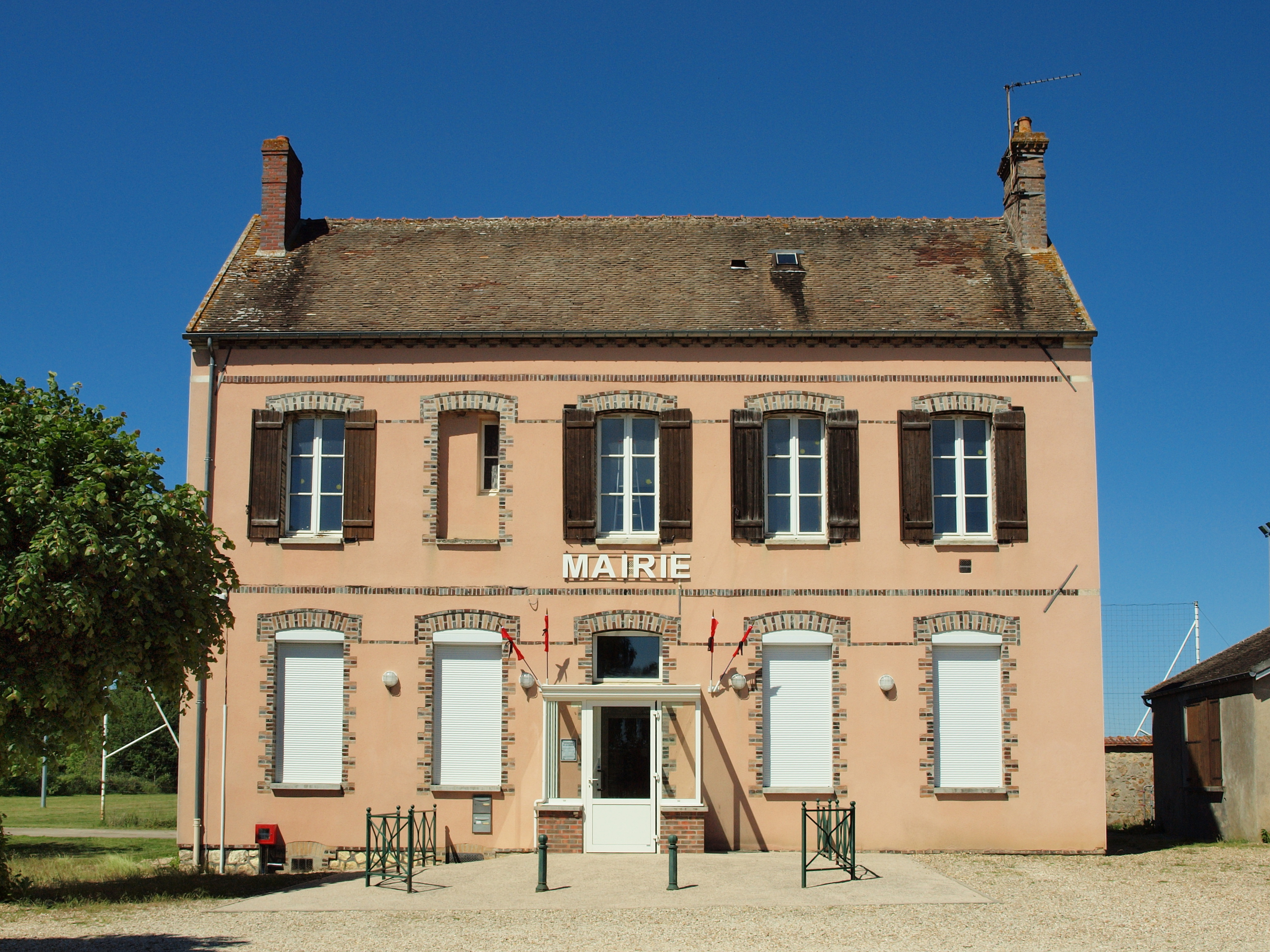
- The town hall in Villeroy
- Location of Villeroy
- Location within France Location within Bourgogne-Franche-Comté
- Coordinates: 48°10′26″N 3°11′14″E
- Country: France
- Region: Bourgogne-Franche-Comté
- Department: Yonne
- Arrondissement: Sens
- Canton: Gâtinais en Bourgogne

Government
  - Mayor (2020–2026): Pierre-Éric Moiron
- Area^{1}: 7.10 km^{2} (2.74 sq mi)
- Highest elevation: 196 m (643 ft)
- Lowest elevation: 145 m (476 ft)
- Population (2023): 384
  - Density: 54.1/km^{2} (140/sq mi)
- Time zone: UTC+01:00 (CET)
  - Summer (DST): UTC+02:00 (CEST)
- INSEE/Postal code: 89466 /89100
- ^{1} French Land Register data, which excludes lakes, ponds, glaciers > 1 km^{2} (0.386 sq mi or 247 acres) and river estuaries.

Villeroy (French pronunciation: [vilʁwa]) is a commune in the Yonne department in Bourgogne-Franche-Comté in north-central France.

== See also ==
- Communes of the Yonne department
