= Château de Madrid =

Former building in Bois de Boulogne, Paris

Coordinates: 48°52′27″N 2°15′18″E

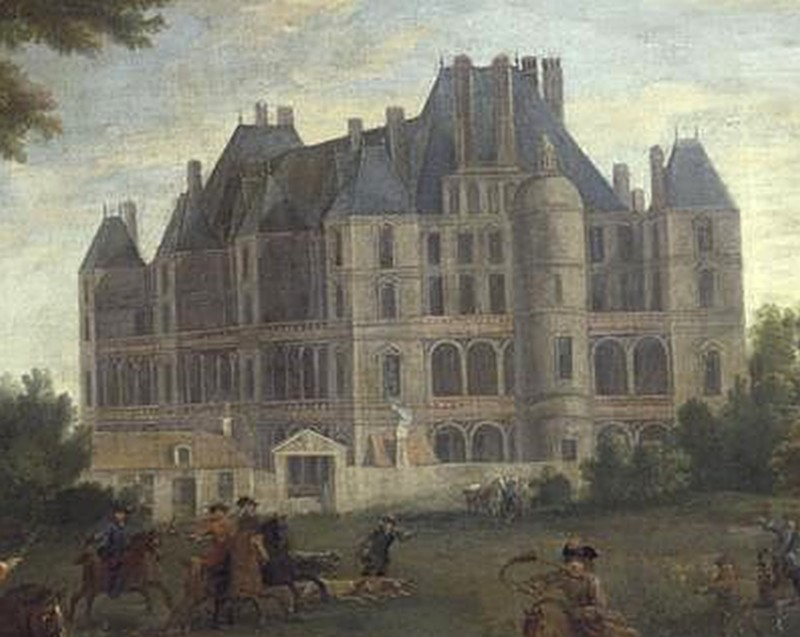
The château in 1722. Painting by Pierre-Denis Martin (1663–1742)

The Château de Madrid was a Renaissance building in France. It was built in Neuilly, on the edge of the Bois de Boulogne, near Paris in the early 16th century. It fell into disuse in the 17th and 18th centuries and was almost completely demolished in the 1790s.

== History ==
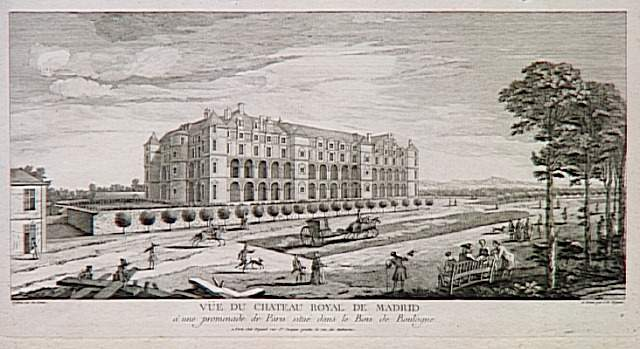
The Château de Madrid in an 18th-century engraving by Jacques Rigaud.

The construction of the château was ordered by Francis I of France in 1528, who had been captured at the Battle of Pavia in 1525 and held for some months in Madrid. On his return to France, Francis found the Louvre uncomfortable and consequently desired a new palace; construction started in 1529.

Initially called the Château de Boulogne, the new building quickly became known as the Château de Madrid, taking its name from the Royal Alcázar of Madrid, the royal castle in Madrid. Both buildings were constructed on the edge of a forest near a large city, and both were made up of a long central corps de logis with loggias on two storeys and a cubical pavilion at each end.

The construction work was at first directed by Florentine Girolamo della Robbia and later by French architects. The building was completed during the reign of Henry II of France, about 1552.

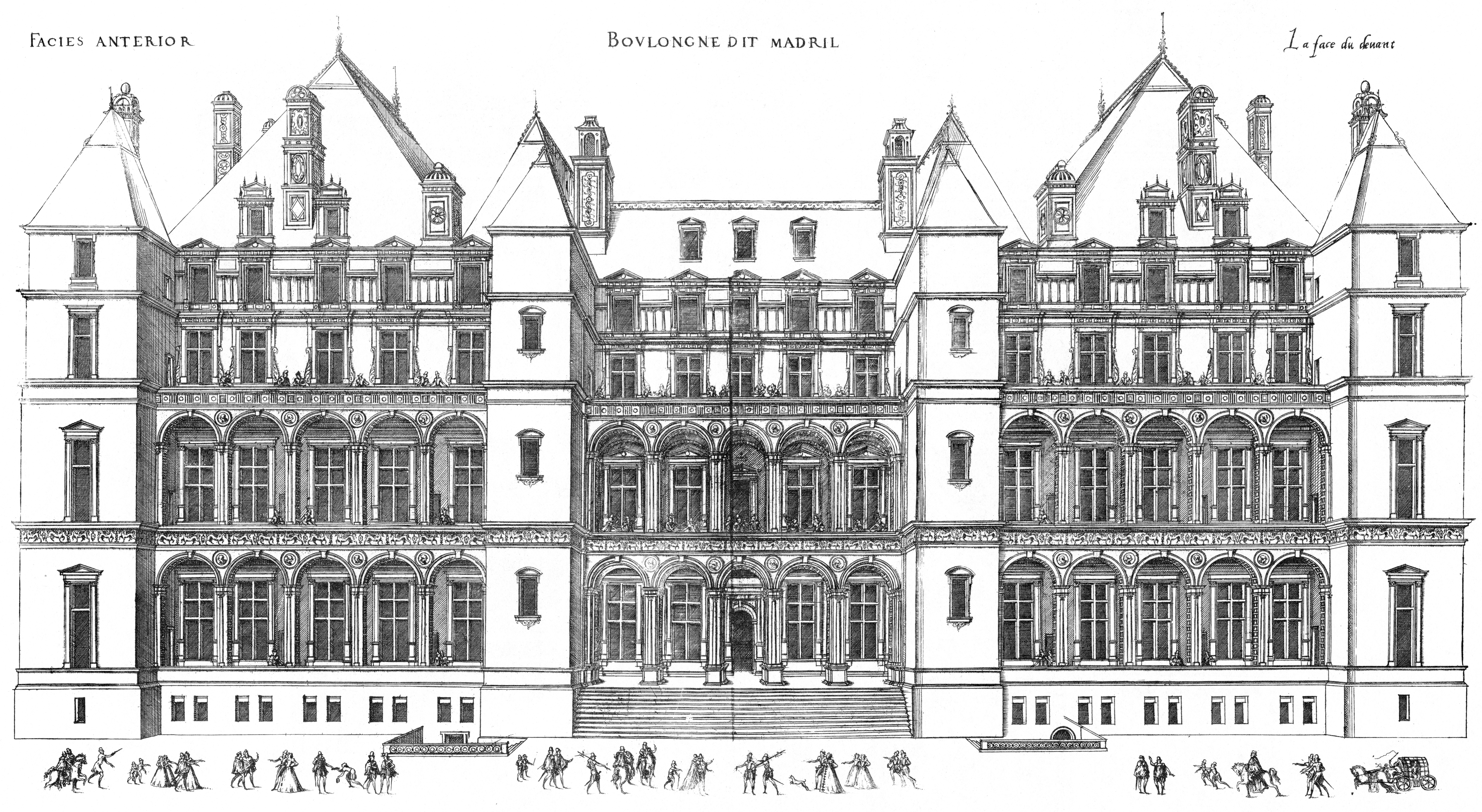
The château's front facade, 1576.

The Château de Madrid was richly decorated inside and out. Almost all of the exterior walls were covered in majolica and high relief; as a result it was also nicknamed the "Château de Faïence", the latter word describing earthenware decorated with colorful opaque glazes. Its architecture bore clear influences from both Renaissance Italy, in that its building plan resembled the letter H and that its exterior was richly ornamented, and France, because of the towers on each corner of both pavilions and its internal layout, based on the Châteaux of Chenonceau and Chambord. This form that was repeated at La Muette and Challeau. The walls of the facades are covered with earthenware, enamelled in relief and bright colors. There are also large enamelled plates on copper, executed in Limoges, nine of which are now in the Musée de Cluny. The chateau was originally surrounded by ditches that were later replaced by walls.

During the Regency of Louis XV, Marie Louise Élisabeth d'Orléans, (the daughter of the Regent) lived at the castle. The château was abandoned by the House of Bourbon after her death in 1719. In 1787, an arrêt du Conseil of Louis XVI ordered it to be sold with a view to demolition, together with the Château de la Muette, the Château de Vincennes and the Château de Blois.

The building was in ruins before the French Revolution, after which it was bought on 27 March 1793 by M. Leroy, he decided to demolish the building with the costs of demolition exceeding the value of the materials. The demolition contractor was paid with assignat banknotes issued by the Revolutionary government. Few traces have survived: one stone capital and three faience fragments are held by the museums of Sèvres and Écouen. The site has been built upon subsequently and the foundations destroyed.
