= Hôtel de Ville, Montereau-Fault-Yonne =

Town hall in Montereau-Fault-Yonne, France

Hôtel de Ville
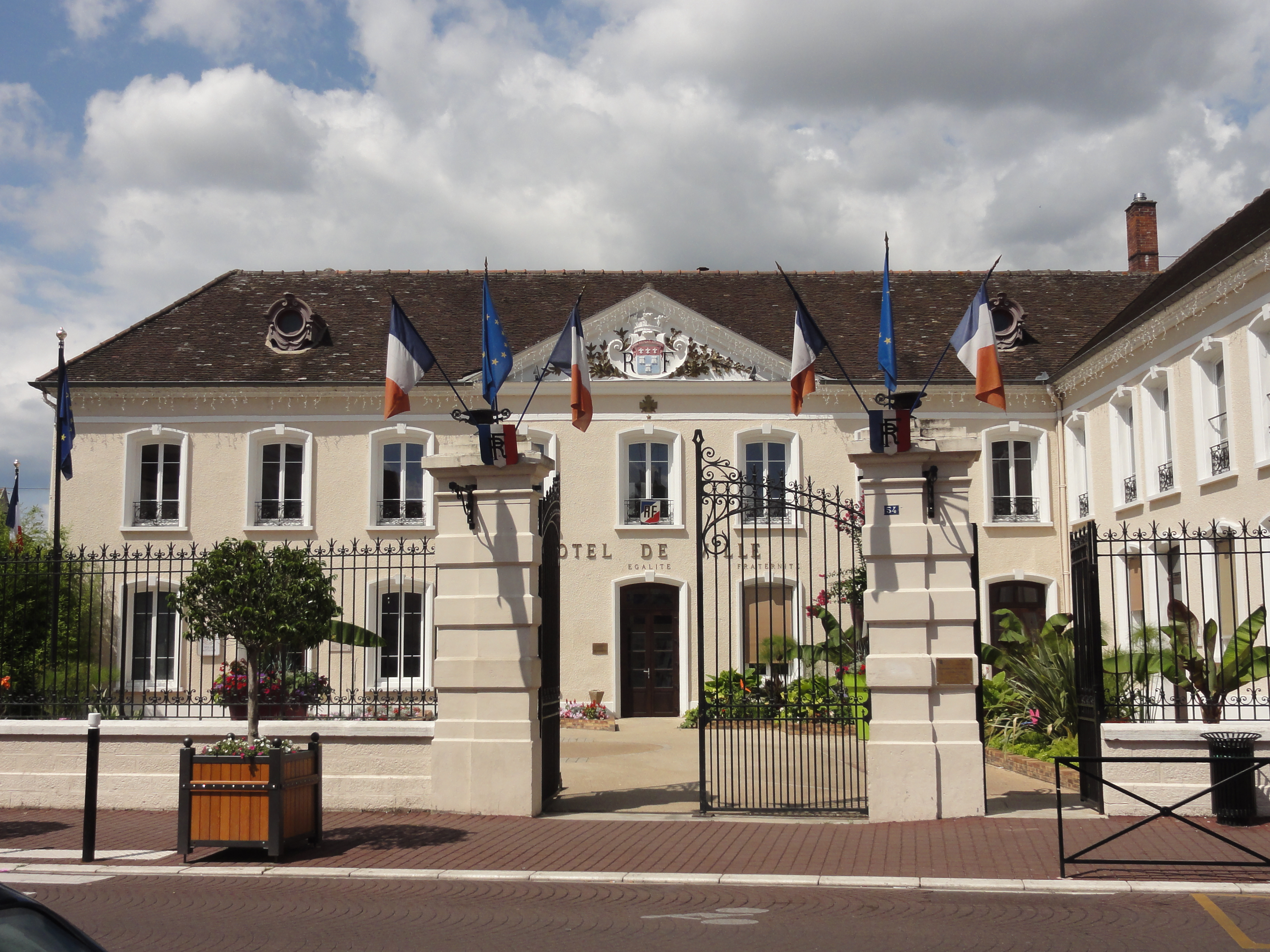
- The main frontage of the Hôtel de Ville in August 2014
- Interactive map of the Hôtel de Ville area

General information
- Type: City hall
- Architectural style: Neoclassical style
- Location: Montereau-Fault-Yonne, France
- Coordinates: 48.3848°N 2.9561°E
- Completed: c.1750

The Hôtel de Ville (French pronunciation: [otɛl də vil], City Hall) is a municipal building in Montereau-Fault-Yonne, Seine-et-Marne, in the southeastern suburbs of Paris, standing on Rue Jean Jaurès.

== History ==
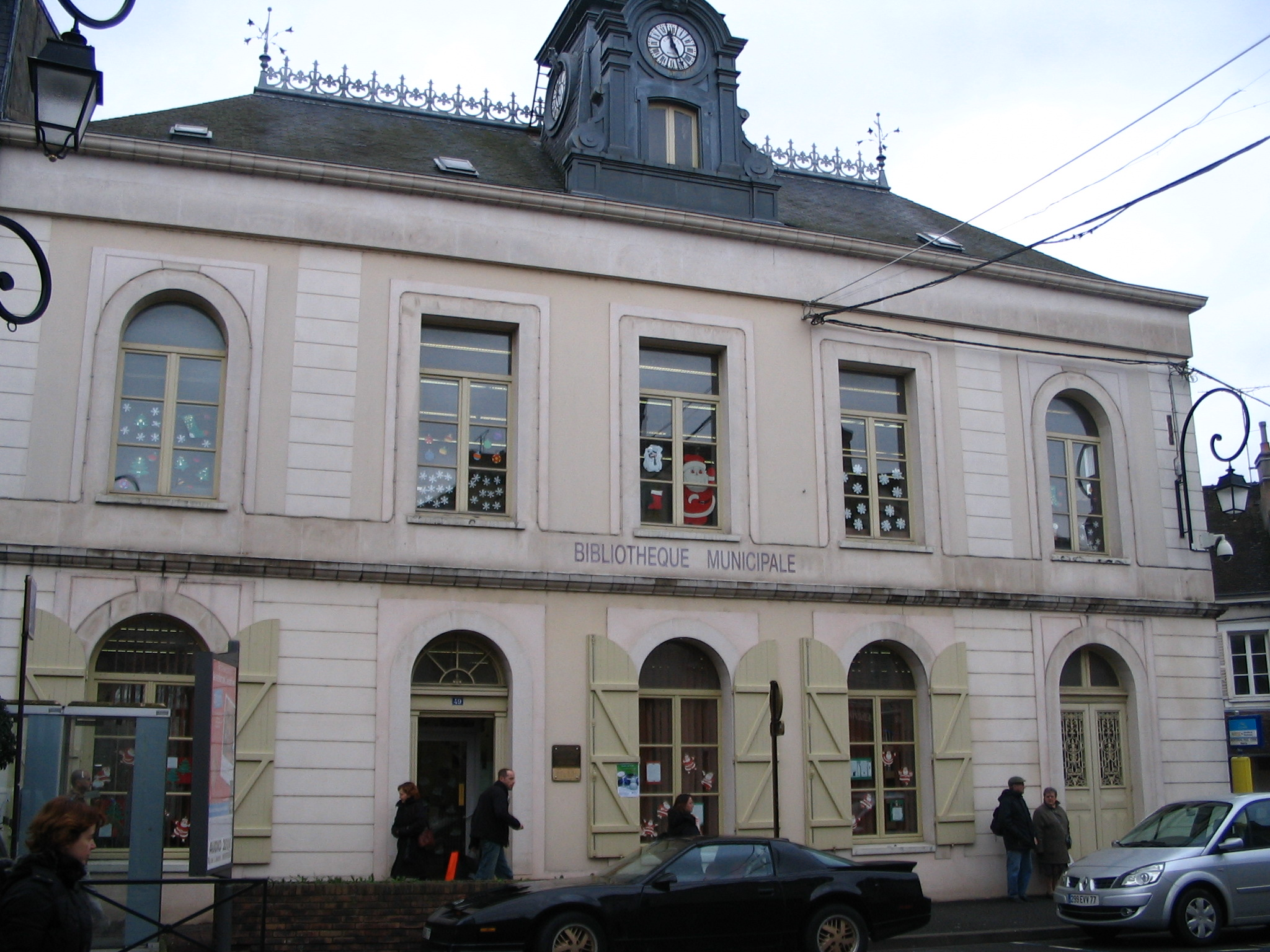
The old town hall

=== The old town hall ===
Following the French Revolution, the new town council originally met in the house of the mayor at the time. This arrangement continued until the mid-1870s when the town council decided to commission a new building on the east side of what is now Rue Jean Jaurès. The building was designed in the neoclassical style, built in ashlar stone and was completed around 1880.

The design involved a symmetrical main frontage of five bays facing onto the street. The end bays contained round-headed doorways with voussoirs on the ground floor and round-headed windows with moulded surrounds and keystones on the first floor. The other bays were fenestrated by round-headed windows on the ground floor and by square-headed windows on the first floor. In early 1892, the building was augmented by a square clock tower, surmounted by an octagonal lantern: local people criticised the tower as unsightly and complained that it overwhelmed the building. Internally, the principal rooms included a municipal office, a room for hearings of the commercial court and an office for the local savings bank.

After the building was no longer required for municipal use, the old town hall became a post office. Later it became the Bibliothèque Municipale Elsa Triolet, named after the Russian writer, Elsa Triolet, and, since 2021, it has accommodated a pharmacy.

=== The current building ===
In 1888, following significant population growth, the council led by the mayor, Jacques Joigneau, decided to acquire a more substantial building. The building they selected, known as l'Ouvroir (the workshop), was on the opposite side of the road, facing the old town hall. It had been commissioned as a private house in the mid-18th century. The building was designed in the neoclassical style and built in brick with a cement render finish. It was laid out with a main block of eight bays facing onto the street, and a north wing of seven bays, which was projected forward. There was a doorway in the central bay of the main block and it was fenestrated by segmental headed windows with keystones on both floors. There was a pediment across the central section of three bays.

By the 1830s, the building was owned by a Madame Maréchal. The Daughters of Charity of Saint Vincent de Paul acquired the building and converted into an orphanage and workshop in 1857. After the nuns relocated to new premises on Rue des Fossés in 1892, the council bought the building and instituted a programme of refurbishment works. These works, which included the conversion of one of the reception rooms into a Salle du Conseil (council chamber), were completed on 19 February 1893. A series of 16th century tapestries depicting scenes from the Trojan War were subsequently installed in the council chamber. These tapestries had been owned by the counsellor of state, Louis Urbain Lefebvre de Caumartin, and were displayed in the Château de Saint-Ange before being seized by the state during the French Revolution and subsequently being acquired by the department of Seine-et-Marne in 1797.
