= Nemours =

- Commune
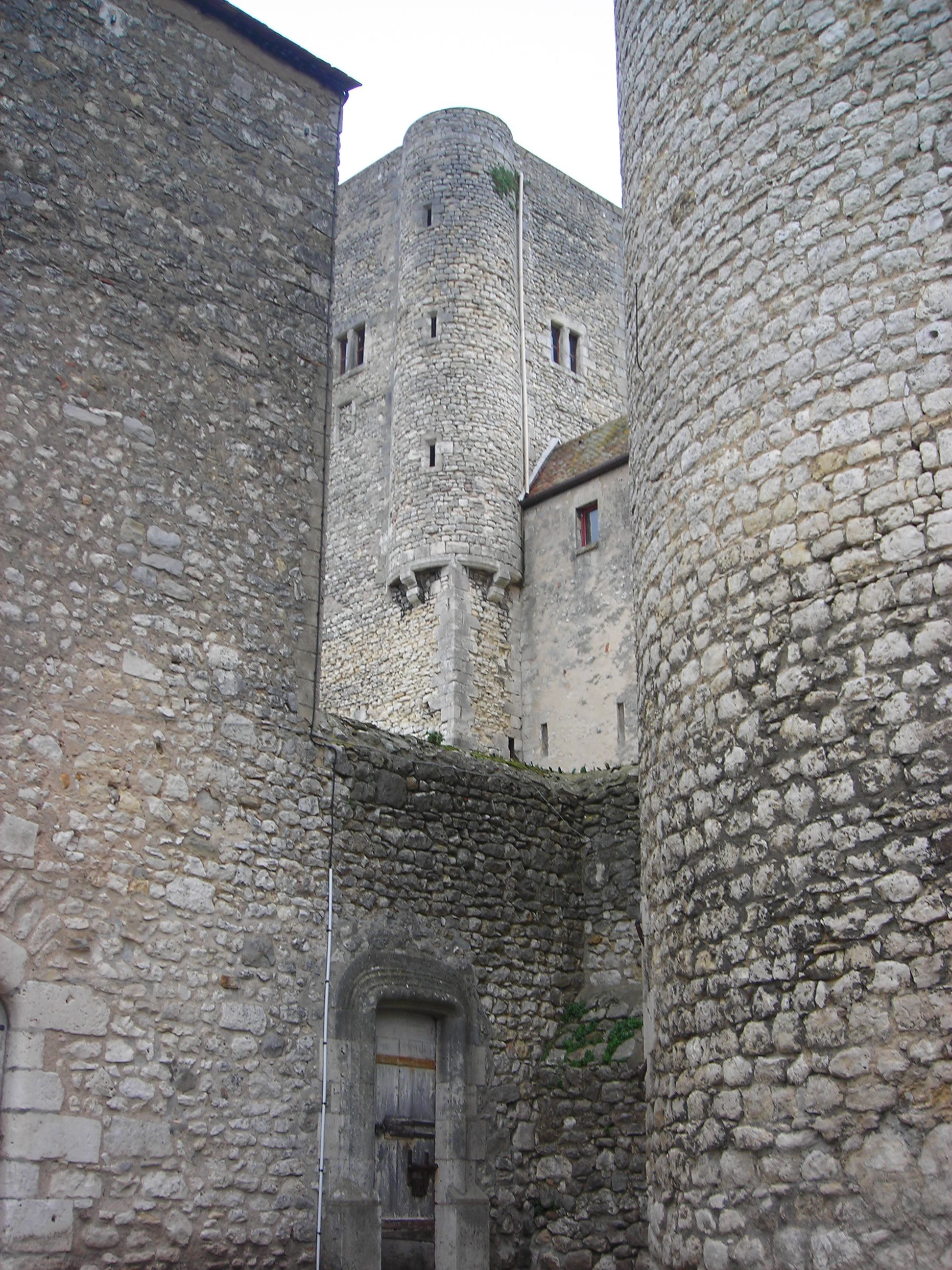
- Castle of Nemours

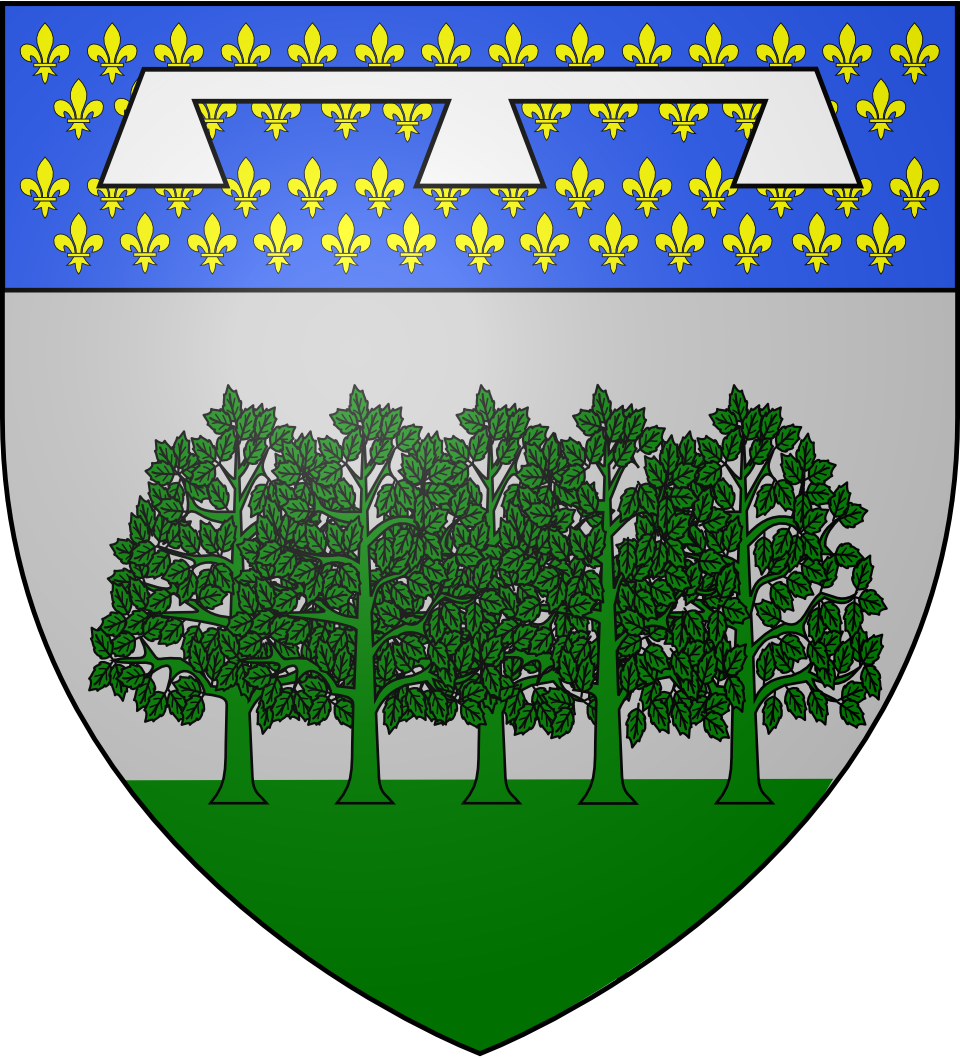
- Coat of arms
- Location of Nemours
- Location within France Location within Île-de-France (region)
- Coordinates: 48°16′03″N 2°41′49″E
- Country: France
- Region: Île-de-France
- Department: Seine-et-Marne
- Arrondissement: Fontainebleau
- Canton: Nemours

Government
  - Mayor (2020–2026): Valérie Lacroute (LR)
- Area^{1}: 10.83 km^{2} (4.18 sq mi)
- Elevation: 62 m (203 ft)
- Highest elevation: 133 m (436 ft)
- Lowest elevation: 57 m (187 ft)
- Population (2023): 12,889
  - Density: 1,190/km^{2} (3,082/sq mi)
- Time zone: UTC+01:00 (CET)
  - Summer (DST): UTC+02:00 (CEST)
- INSEE/Postal code: 77333 /77140
- ^{1} French Land Register data, which excludes lakes, ponds, glaciers > 1 km^{2} (0.386 sq mi or 247 acres) and river estuaries.

Nemours (French: [nəmuʁ]) is a commune in the Seine-et-Marne department in the Île-de-France region in north-central France.

== Geography ==
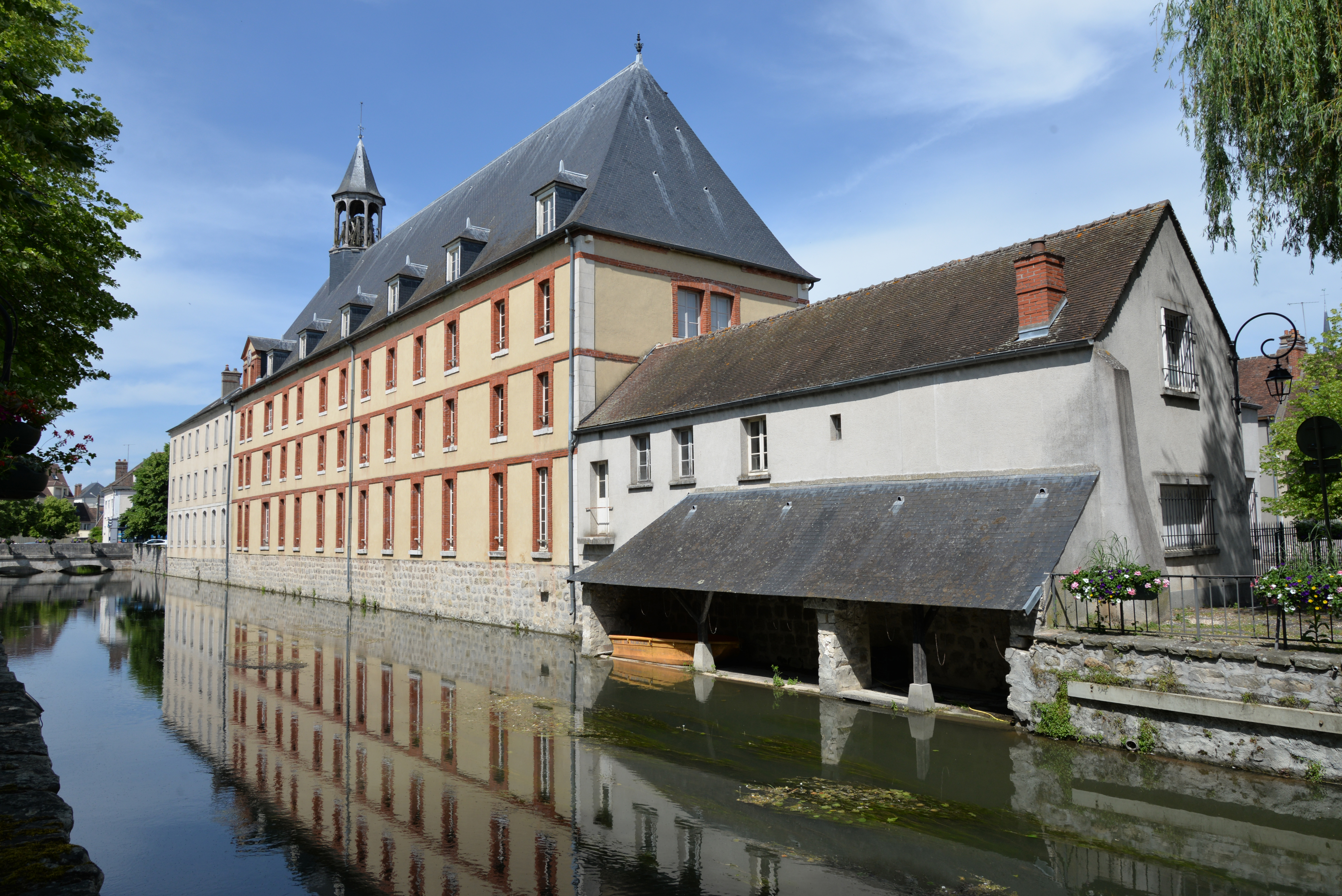
The Hôtel de Ville

Nemours is located on the Loing and its canal, c. 42 km (26 mi) south of Melun, on the Moret–Lyon railway. Nemours – Saint-Pierre station has rail connections to Montargis, Melun, Nevers and Paris. The Grand pont de Nemours designed by Jean-Rodolphe Perronet crosses the Loing in the south of the city.

== History ==
Nemours is supposed to derive its name from the woods (nemora) in the midst of which it formerly stood, and discoveries of Gallo-Roman remains indicate its early origin. It was captured by the English in 1420, but derives its historical importance rather from the lordship (afterwards duchy) of Nemours, and the fief lords the Duke of Nemours to which it gave its name. In 1585 a treaty revoking previous concessions to the Protestants was concluded at Nemours between Catherine de' Medici and the Guises.

The Hôtel de Ville was commissioned as a convent in 1669.

== Demographics ==
Inhabitants are called Nemouriens in French.

Historical population
Year	Pop.	±% p.a.
1968	8,131	—
1975	11,223	+4.71%
1982	11,665	+0.55%
1990	12,072	+0.43%
1999	12,898	+0.74%
2007	12,813	−0.08%
2012	12,770	−0.07%
2017	13,081	+0.48%
2023	12,889	−0.25%
Source: INSEE

== Sights ==
The church, which dates mainly from the sixteenth century, has a handsome wooden spire. The feudal castle, erected around 1120 was turned into a museum in the 20th century. It has a central keep with four rounded towers.

A statue of the mathematician Bézout (d. 1783), a native of the town, was erected in 1885.

In the vicinity is a group of fine sandstone rocks, and sand is extensively quarried.

The city also hosts the Musée de Préhistoire d'Île-de-France, museum dedicated to prehistory in Île-de-France region.

Close to the city, at Saint-Pierre-lès-Nemours, is located the forest Massif forestier des Rochers-Gréau.

== Hospital ==
Nemours has a campus of the Centre hospitalier Sud Seine et Marne.

== Notable people ==
Nemours was the birthplace of:

- Rudi Garcia, trainer of the Belgium Football Team (1962)
- Pierre Berthier (1782–1861), geologist and mining engineer
- Étienne Bézout (1730–1783), mathematician
- Geoffrey Kondogbia (born 1993), professional footballer
- Justin-Chrysostome Sanson (1833–1910), sculptor
- Philippe Petit (1949-), highwire artist

Also, Claudia Cardinale (1938–2025), a famous cinema actress and icon, spent her last years here, until her final day.

== Twin towns – sister cities ==
Nemours is twinned with:

- Mühltal, Germany
- Wilmington, United States

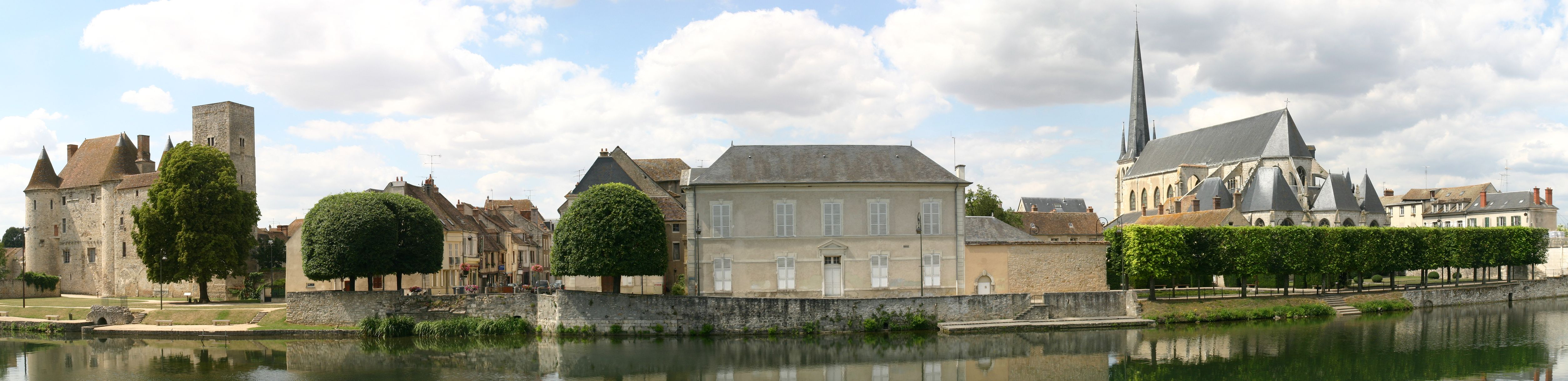
The castle and the church bordering the Loing river

== See also ==
- Pierre Samuel du Pont de Nemours
- Duke of Nemours
- Communes of the Seine-et-Marne department

== Climate ==
Climate data for Nemours (1991–2020 normals, extremes 1990–present)
Month	Jan	Feb	Mar	Apr	May	Jun	Jul	Aug	Sep	Oct	Nov	Dec	Year
Record high °C (°F)	17.0 (62.6)	21.6 (70.9)	26.8 (80.2)	29.2 (84.6)	32.9 (91.2)	38.7 (101.7)	42.5 (108.5)	41.1 (106.0)	35.9 (96.6)	29.9 (85.8)	23.4 (74.1)	17.9 (64.2)	42.5 (108.5)
Mean daily maximum °C (°F)	7.3 (45.1)	8.8 (47.8)	13.0 (55.4)	16.7 (62.1)	20.4 (68.7)	24.0 (75.2)	26.7 (80.1)	26.5 (79.7)	22.2 (72.0)	17.0 (62.6)	11.1 (52.0)	7.8 (46.0)	16.8 (62.2)
Daily mean °C (°F)	4.5 (40.1)	5.1 (41.2)	8.2 (46.8)	11.0 (51.8)	14.7 (58.5)	18.1 (64.6)	20.4 (68.7)	20.1 (68.2)	16.4 (61.5)	12.6 (54.7)	7.9 (46.2)	5.0 (41.0)	12.0 (53.6)
Mean daily minimum °C (°F)	1.7 (35.1)	1.4 (34.5)	3.3 (37.9)	5.3 (41.5)	9.0 (48.2)	12.1 (53.8)	14.1 (57.4)	13.8 (56.8)	10.5 (50.9)	8.2 (46.8)	4.6 (40.3)	2.3 (36.1)	7.2 (45.0)
Record low °C (°F)	−13.3 (8.1)	−13.4 (7.9)	−11.7 (10.9)	−4.6 (23.7)	−0.9 (30.4)	2.0 (35.6)	6.1 (43.0)	4.4 (39.9)	0.5 (32.9)	−4.7 (23.5)	−10.9 (12.4)	−12.1 (10.2)	−13.4 (7.9)
Average precipitation mm (inches)	52.0 (2.05)	50.0 (1.97)	49.1 (1.93)	53.2 (2.09)	63.4 (2.50)	59.1 (2.33)	54.3 (2.14)	57.5 (2.26)	54.9 (2.16)	67.8 (2.67)	64.0 (2.52)	65.0 (2.56)	690.3 (27.18)
Average precipitation days (≥ 1.0 mm)	11.4	10.3	9.6	9.0	9.6	8.6	7.4	7.7	8.0	10.0	11.0	12.1	114.8
Source: Meteociel
