= Ecotron =

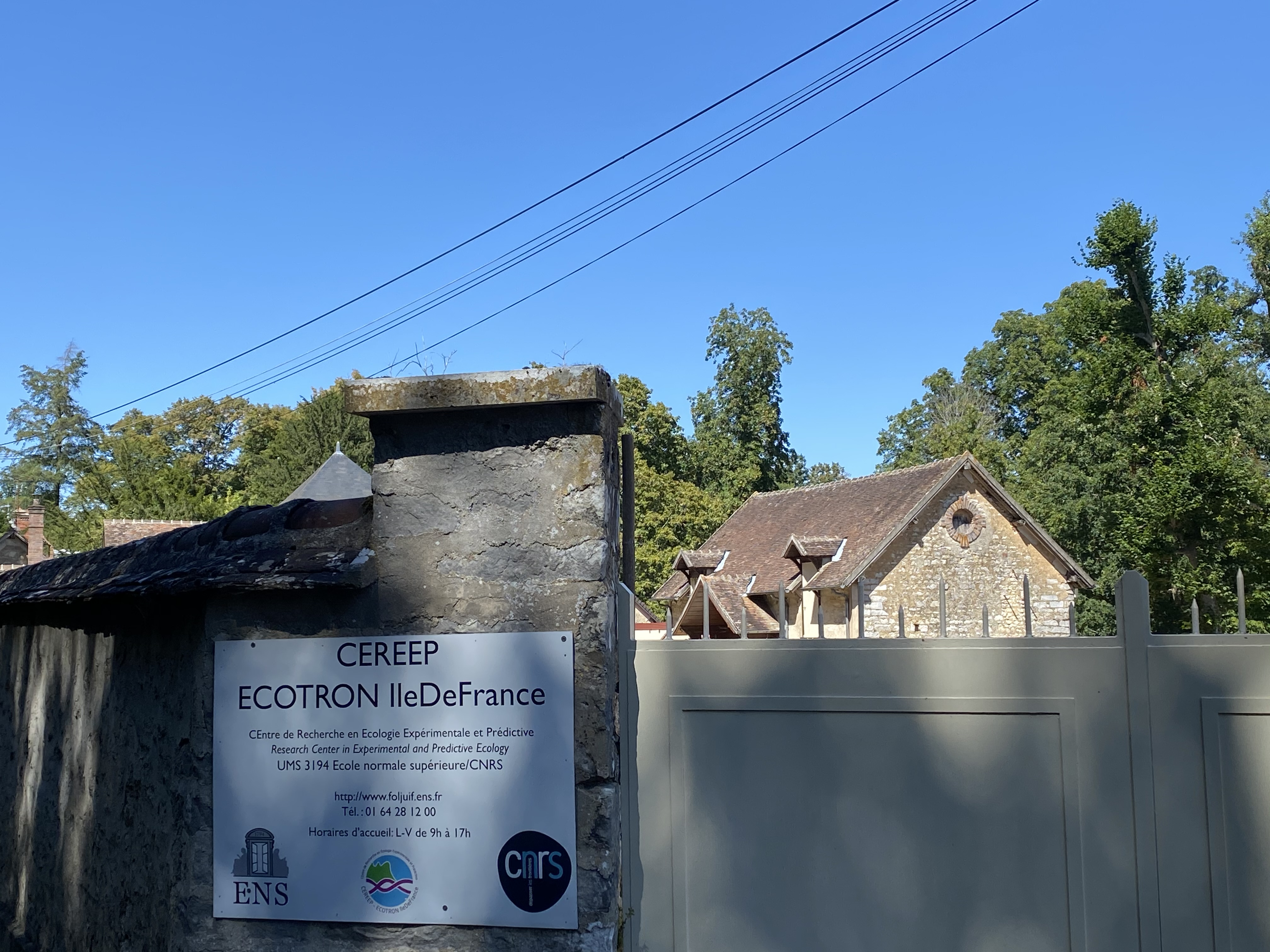
Ecotron Île-de-France main entrance at Saint-Pierre-lès-Nemours

An Ecotron is an experimental instrument in ecology consisting of a controlled environment which makes it possible to simultaneously condition the environment of natural, simplified, or completely artificial ecosystems and measure the processes generated by living beings present in these ecosystems, in particular the flow of matter and energy.

== Design ==
Its principle is to confine ecosystems in totally or partially waterproof enclosures which are permeable to energy flow and capable of generating a range of physical and chemical conditions applied to terrestrial or aquatic ecosystems, continental or marine. Environmental control and real-time measurements are precise enough to test hypotheses or operating models. For this purpose, the enclosures are fitted with significant equipment allowing continuous measurement of fluxes, states or biological characteristics. Other specific measurements, in situ and ex situ, on samples taken complete these online measurements. A sufficient number of independent confinement chambers is necessary to study several interacting factors in a framework of statistical inference.

Depending on the case, we speak of a macrocosm when the space is large enough to study several m^{3} of reconstituted ecosystem over a period of time, generally measured in years (3–5 years or more for example), of microcosm for volumes measuring in cubic decimeters (study of fungal, bacterial, soil ecosystems, etc.) and mesocosm for intermediate situations.

== Bibliography ==
- Lawton, J. H., Naeem, S., Woodfin, R. M., Brown, V. K., Gange, A., Godfray, H. J. C., Heads, P. A., Lawler, S., Magda, D., Thomas, C. D., Thompson, L. J. & Young, S. (1993) "The Ecotron – a Controlled Environmental Facility for the Investigation of Population and Ecosystem Processes." Phil. Trans. R. Soc. B, 341, 181–194.
- Lawton, J. H. (1996) "The Ecotron facility at Silwood Park: The value of big bottle" experiments. Ecology, 77, 665–669.
- Loreau, M. (1998) Biodiversité et fonctionnement des écosystèmes n°81, pp. 3–7. French National Centre for Scientific Research, Paris.
