= Massif forestier des Rochers-Gréau =

Forest in the south of Île-de-France

Coordinates: 48.2633171081543°N 2.683295965194702°E

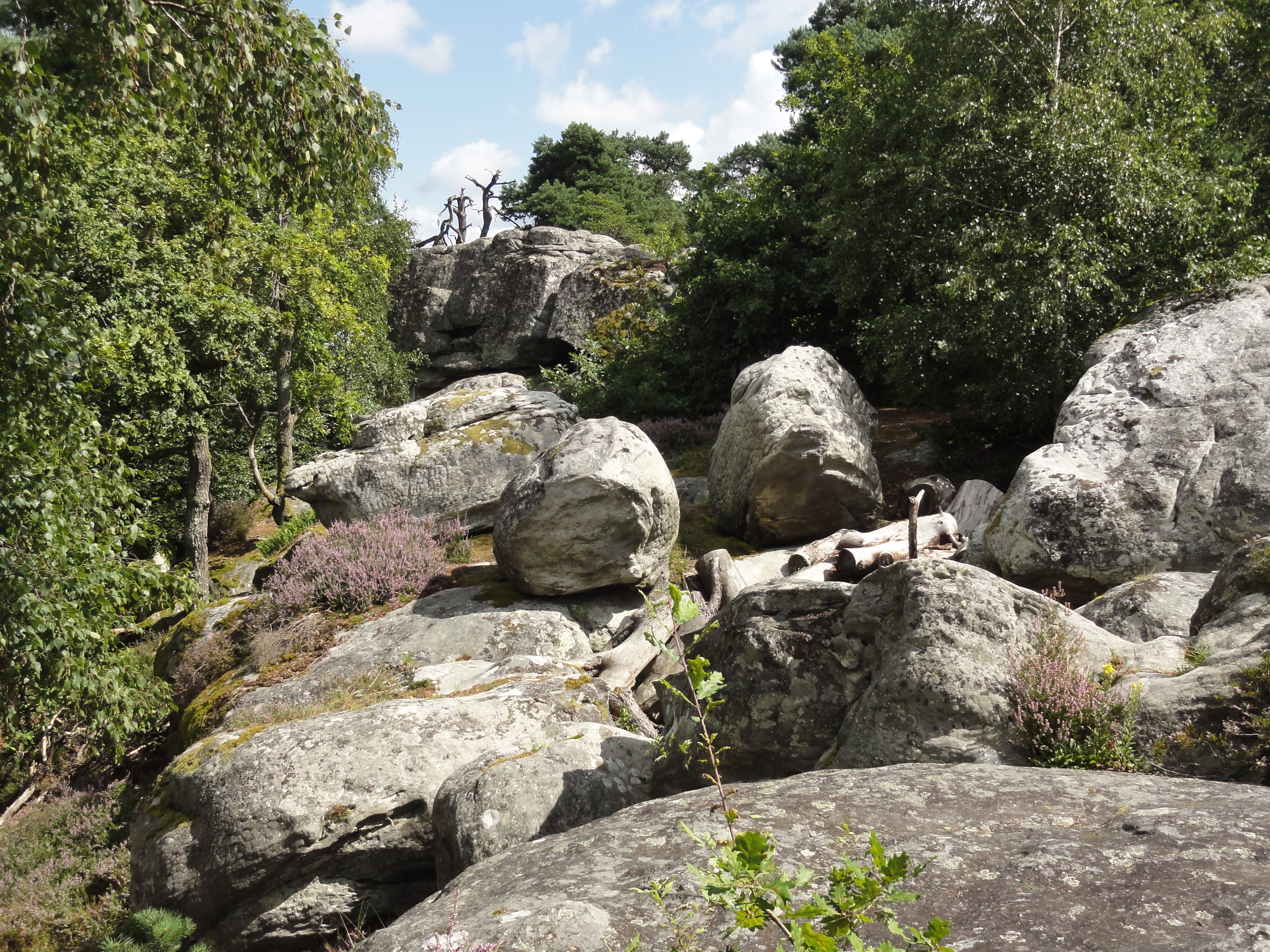
Massif forestier des Rochers-Gréau

The Massif forestier des Rochers-Gréau ("Rochers-Gréau forest massif") is a massif in the south of Île-de-France.

== Location ==
The park is located in the town of Saint-Pierre-lès-Nemours near the church and the town hall, in the department of Seine-et-Marne.

== Description ==
Property of the town of Nemours. It is home to rocks with unusual shapes, the best known of which is the “turtle”.
