= Montereau-Fault-Yonne =

- Commune
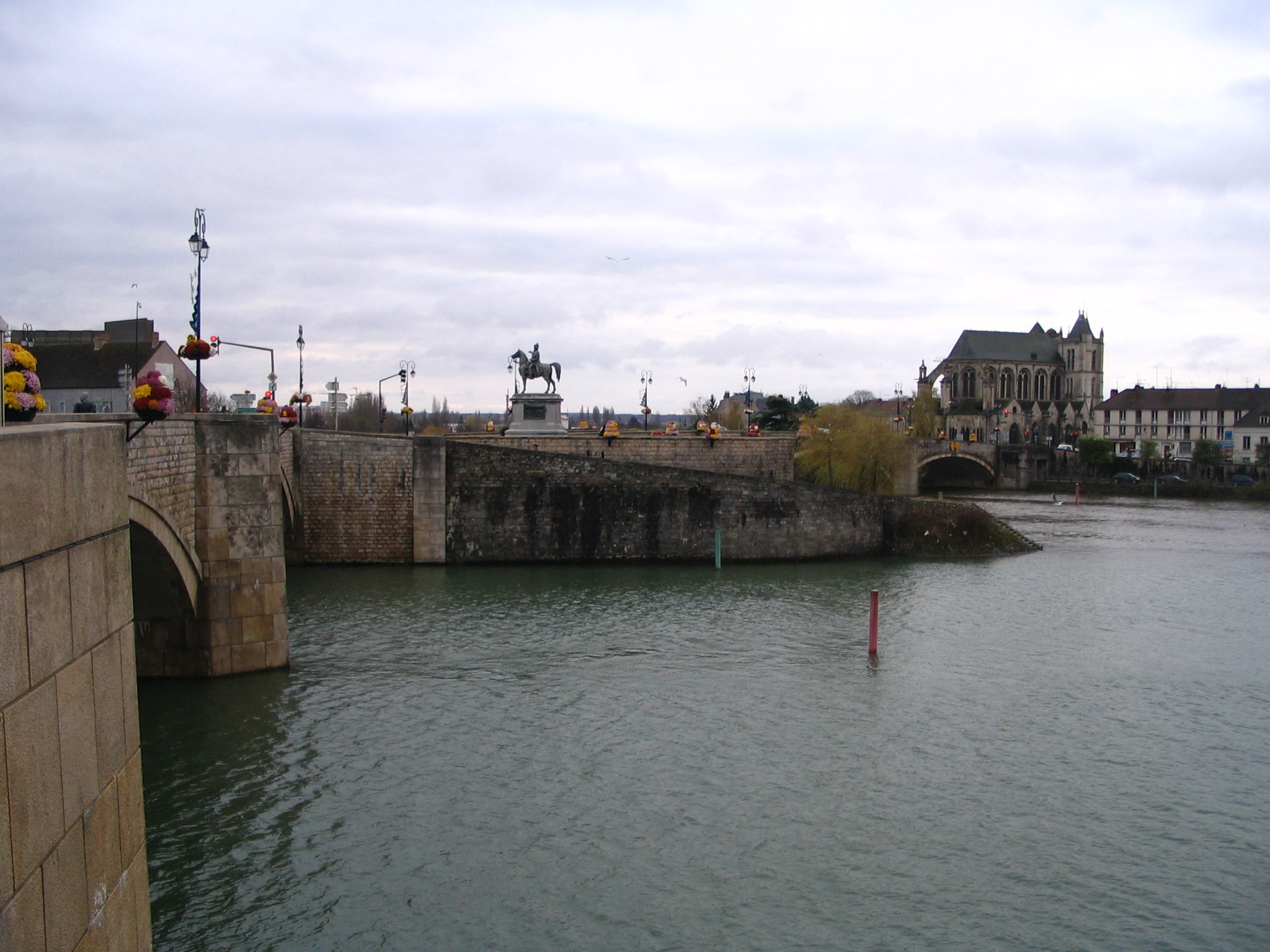
- Bridges over rivers Seine (foreground), Yonne (background) and statue of Napoléon

- Coat of arms
- Location of Montereau-Fault-Yonne
- Location within France Location within Île-de-France (region)
- Coordinates: 48°23′07″N 2°57′03″E
- Country: France
- Region: Île-de-France
- Department: Seine-et-Marne
- Arrondissement: Provins
- Canton: Montereau-Fault-Yonne
- Intercommunality: CC Pays de Montereau

Government
  - Mayor (2020–2026): James Chéron
- Area^{1}: 9.1 km^{2} (3.5 sq mi)
- Elevation: 53 m (174 ft)
- Highest elevation: 121 m (397 ft)
- Lowest elevation: 47 m (154 ft)
- Population (2023): 22,279
  - Density: 2,400/km^{2} (6,300/sq mi)
- Time zone: UTC+01:00 (CET)
  - Summer (DST): UTC+02:00 (CEST)
- INSEE/Postal code: 77305 /77130
- ^{1} French Land Register data, which excludes lakes, ponds, glaciers > 1 km^{2} (0.386 sq mi or 247 acres) and river estuaries.

Montereau-Fault-Yonne (French pronunciation: [mɔ̃tʁo fot‿jɔn], before 1992: Montereau-Faut-Yonne), or simply Montereau, is a commune in the Seine-et-Marne department in the Île-de-France region in north-central France.

== Geography ==
Montereau-Fault-Yonne straddles the confluence of the rivers Yonne and Seine at the far south-east of the Île-de-France region, 70 km southeast of its administrative centre, Paris. The A5 autoroute (Paris–Troyes–Chaumont) passes northeast of the town. Montereau station links by rail Laroche-Migennes, Melun and Paris. It is approximately equidistant between slightly larger Melun and Sens.

== Name ==
The city takes its name from its geographical position on the confluence of the Yonne and the Seine rivers. Fault, also spelled faut comes from the verb faillir ("to fail") in its old meaning to fall. Montereau is where the Yonne falls into the Seine.

== Sights ==
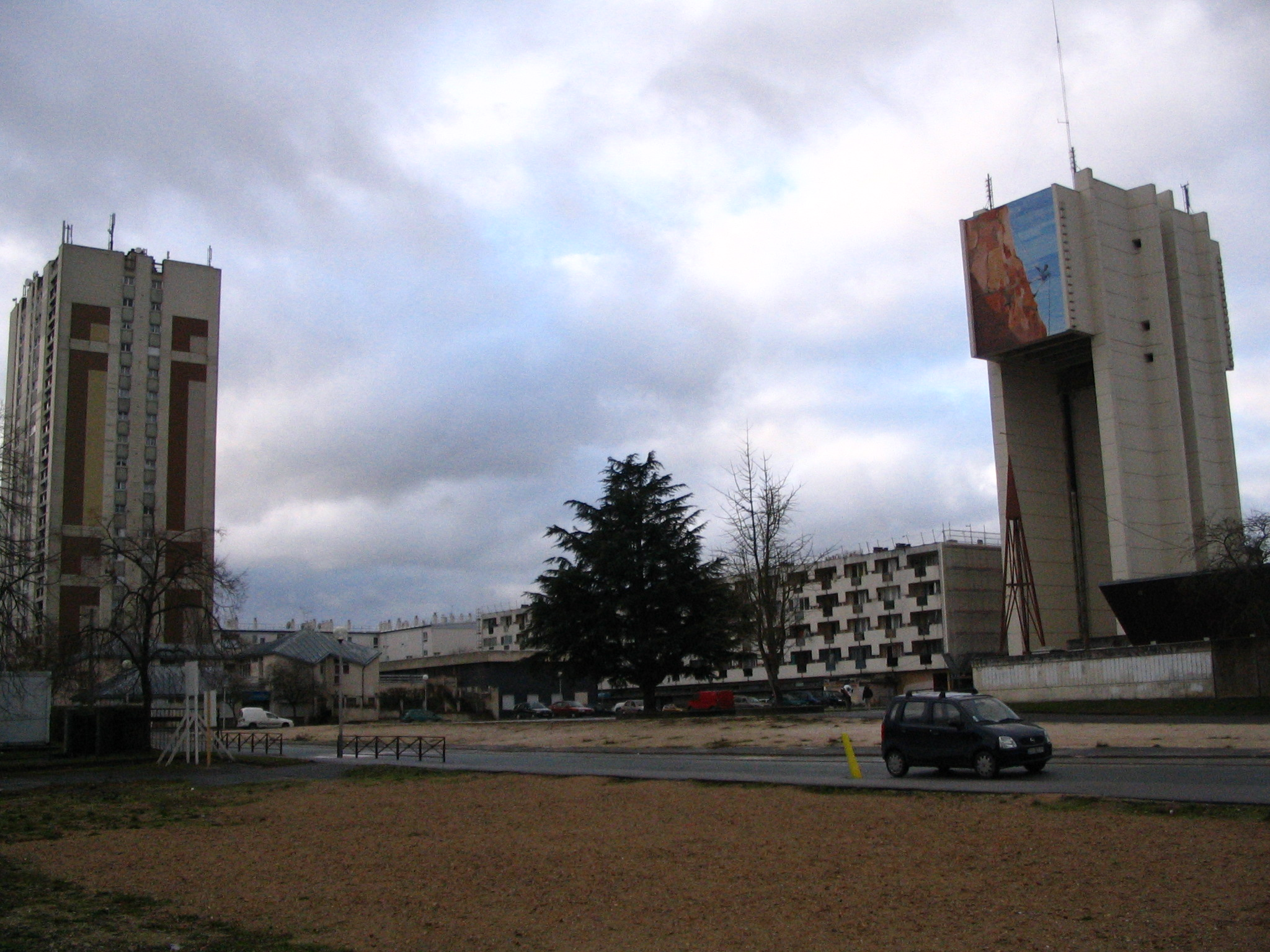
John XXIII Square, in Surville.

The town is split in three by the rivers, ville basse situated on the southern shore and Surville on the hill to the north. The old town centre is located in ville basse while Surville is an assembly of high rise buildings, erected after World War II, and is in many ways a typical cité in the Île-de-France. Some of these high rise buildings are now (2005) going to be destroyed and replaced by individual houses. The old château-park in Surville (now the site of a high school Lycée André Malraux) however gives a very nice view over the confluent and the Seine-et-Marne region. On the east side, between the two rivers, are the port and an industrial park.

== History ==
In 1359, the King of Navarre Charles II of Navarre, who held the town because of his Champagne ascent, lost it to the regent of France (the future king Charles V).

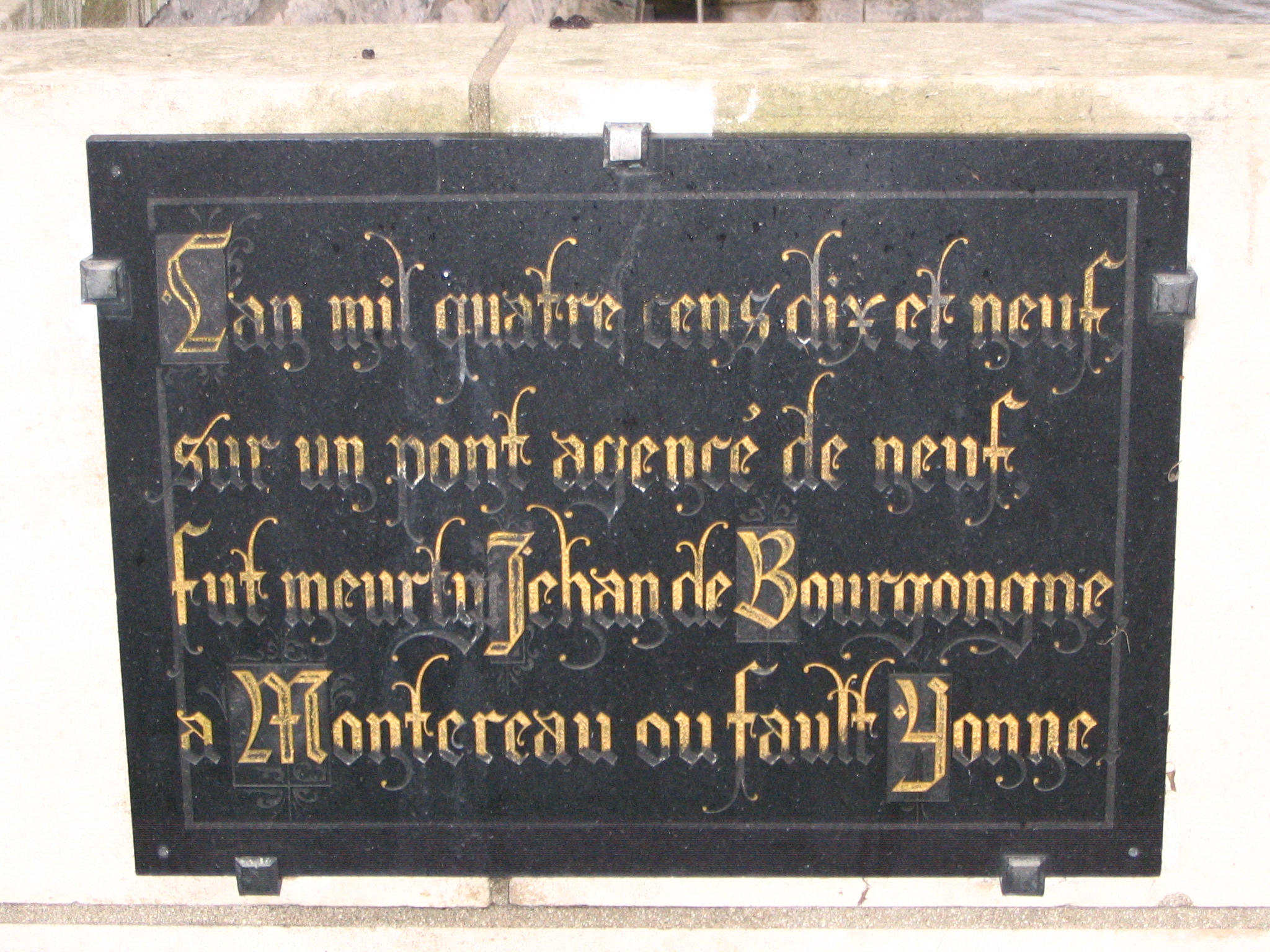
Plaque commemorating the murder in 1419 of John the Fearless, on the bridge crossing the Yonne river.

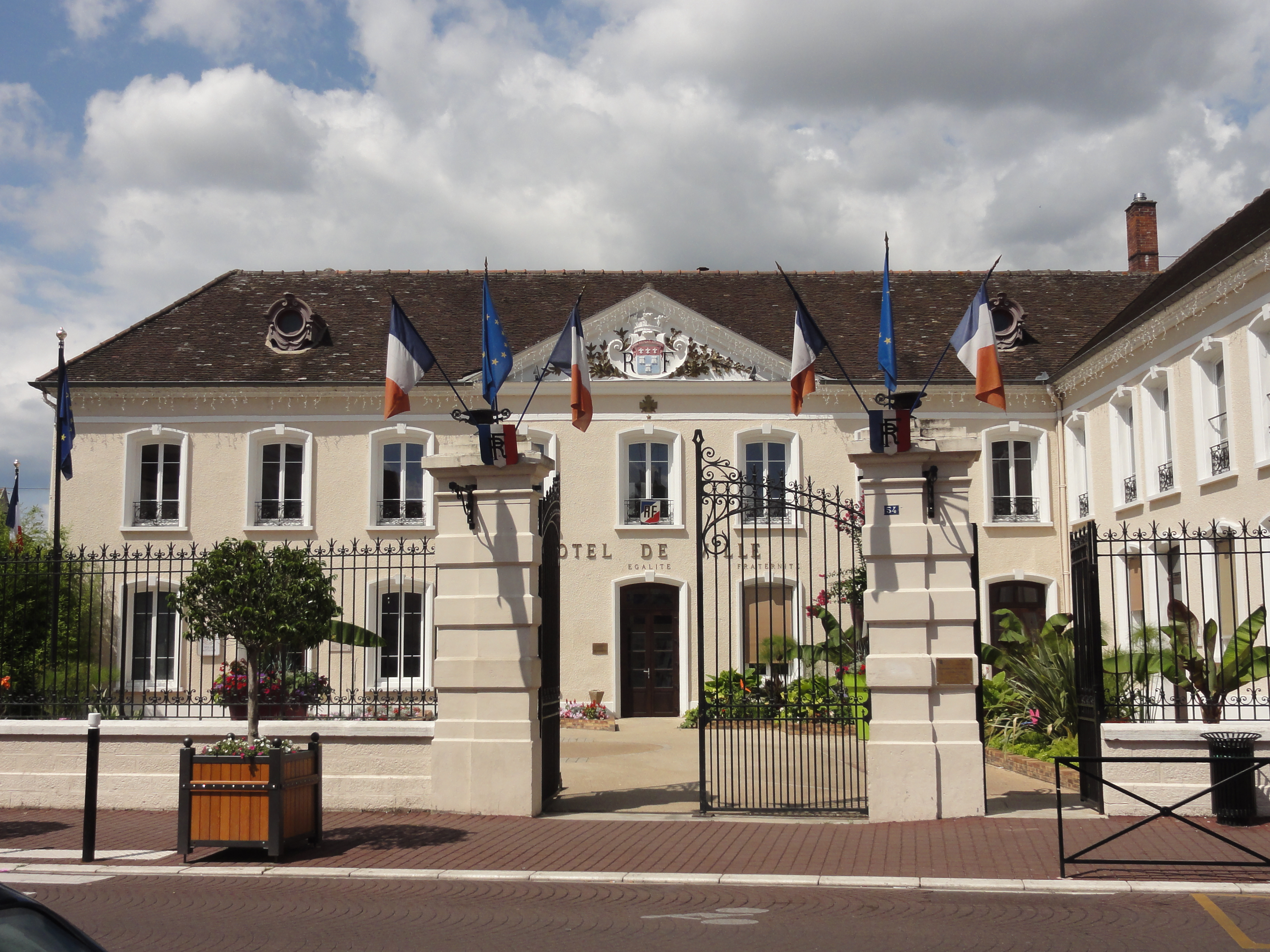
The Hôtel de Ville

John the Fearless was killed on the town's bridge in September, 1419 by Tanneguy du Chastel and the sire de Barbazan, during a conference with the dauphin (who became in 1422 Charles VII). An inscription on the bridge recalls the event. In the collegiate church Notre-Dame-et-Saint-Loup there is a sword which has long been said to be John the Fearless', but actually this sword is certainly more recent.

In 1420, Philip the Good, the son of John the Fearless, seized the town, which remained for eight years in the hands of the Anglo-Burgundian coalition. However, at the end of a long siege, the king Charles VII, helped by Jacques de Chabannes and Jean de Dunois, managed to take it again.

In 1567, during the Wars of Religion, Condé briefly seized the town.

In 1587, the inhabitants of Montereau sided with the Catholic League, but in 1590 they accepted the legitimacy of the new king Henry IV.

The Hôtel de Ville was commissioned in the mid-18th century.

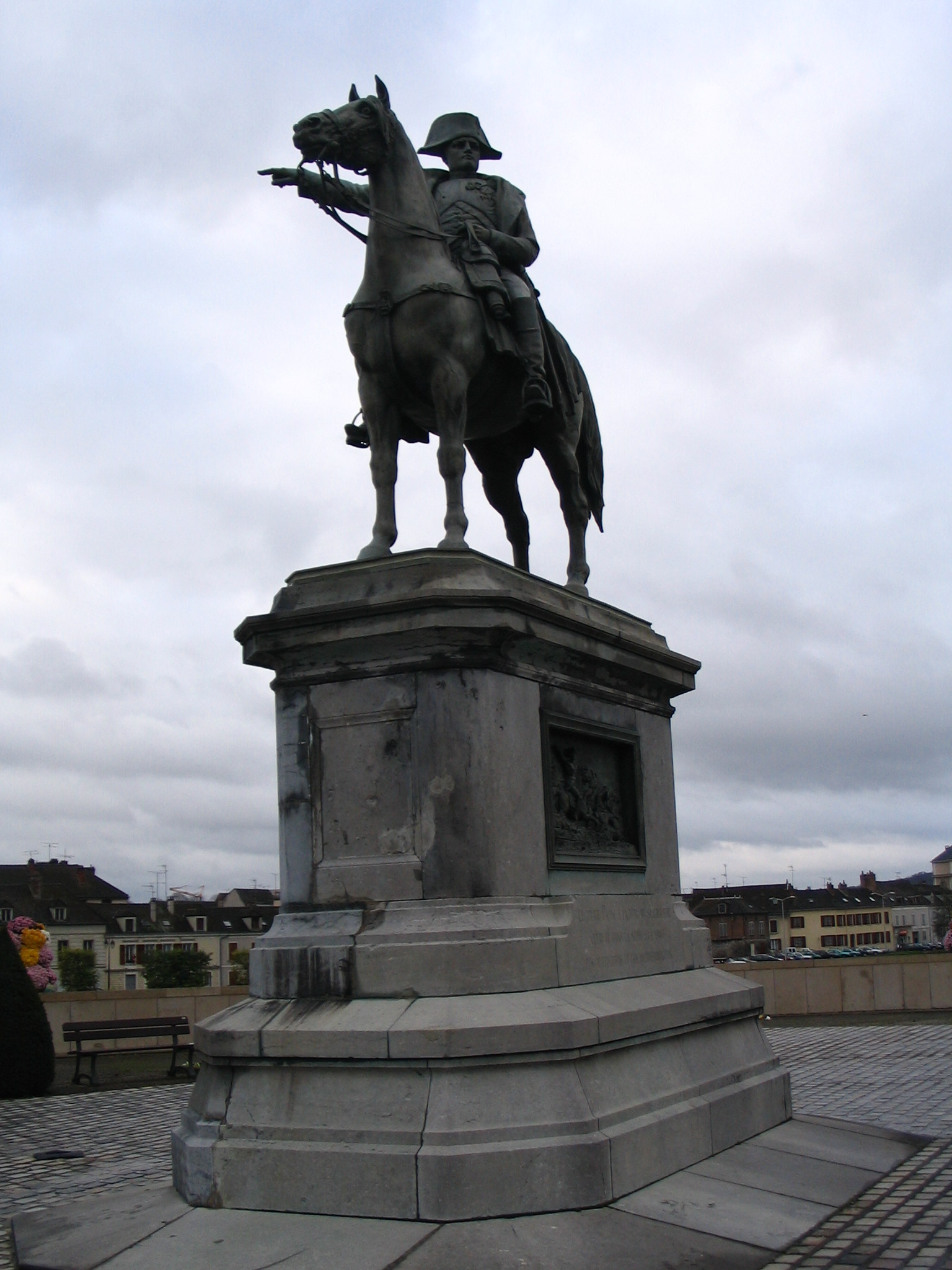
Statue of Napoleon, erected during the Second Empire on the bridge of Montereau.

Montereau was also the place of one of the last victories of Napoleon on 14 February 1814.

In January 2012, the mayor proposed development of Napoleon's Bivouac, a commemorative theme park at a projected cost of 200 million euros. The plans remain in dispute and nothing has been built.

== Demographics ==
Inhabitants of Montereau-Fault-Yonne are called Monterelais. The urban area of Montereau-Fault-Yonne has 31,193 inhabitants (2022).

Historical population

| Year | Pop. | ±% p.a. |
|---|---|---|
| 1793 | 3,115 | — |
| 1800 | 3,364 | +1.10% |
| 1806 | 3,453 | +0.44% |
| 1821 | 3,945 | +0.89% |
| 1831 | 4,153 | +0.52% |
| 1836 | 4,494 | +1.59% |
| 1841 | 4,450 | −0.20% |
| 1846 | 4,942 | +2.12% |
| 1851 | 5,465 | +2.03% |
| 1856 | 6,063 | +2.10% |
| 1861 | 6,217 | +0.50% |
| 1866 | 6,748 | +1.65% |
| 1872 | 6,714 | −0.08% |
| 1876 | 7,041 | +1.20% |
| 1881 | 7,306 | +0.74% |
| 1886 | 7,709 | +1.08% |
| 1891 | 7,672 | −0.10% |
| 1896 | 8,041 | +0.94% |
| 1901 | 7,929 | −0.28% |

| Year | Pop. | ±% p.a. |
|---|---|---|
| 1906 | 8,213 | +0.71% |
| 1911 | 8,617 | +0.97% |
| 1921 | 8,853 | +0.27% |
| 1926 | 9,314 | +1.02% |
| 1931 | 9,965 | +1.36% |
| 1936 | 9,322 | −1.33% |
| 1946 | 8,962 | −0.39% |
| 1954 | 10,119 | +1.53% |
| 1962 | 14,121 | +4.25% |
| 1968 | 19,789 | +5.79% |
| 1975 | 21,568 | +1.24% |
| 1982 | 19,413 | −1.49% |
| 1990 | 18,657 | −0.50% |
| 1999 | 17,625 | −0.63% |
| 2007 | 16,802 | −0.60% |
| 2012 | 16,682 | −0.14% |
| 2017 | 20,206 | +3.91% |
| 2023 | 22,279 | +1.64% |

Data since 1962 : Population without double counting, Data since 2006 : Municipal population
Source: EHESS and INSEE

== Hospital ==
Montereau has a campus of the Centre hospitalier Sud Seine et Marne.

== Economy ==
Historically, the city has sported a strong industrial base and thus has strong blue collar roots. In recent decades, unemployment has become an increasing problem, especially within the immigrant community in Surville.

== Twin towns ==
Montereau is twinned with the British town of Otley, north of Leeds.

== See also ==
- Communes of the Seine-et-Marne department
