= Saint-Pierre-lès-Nemours =

- Commune
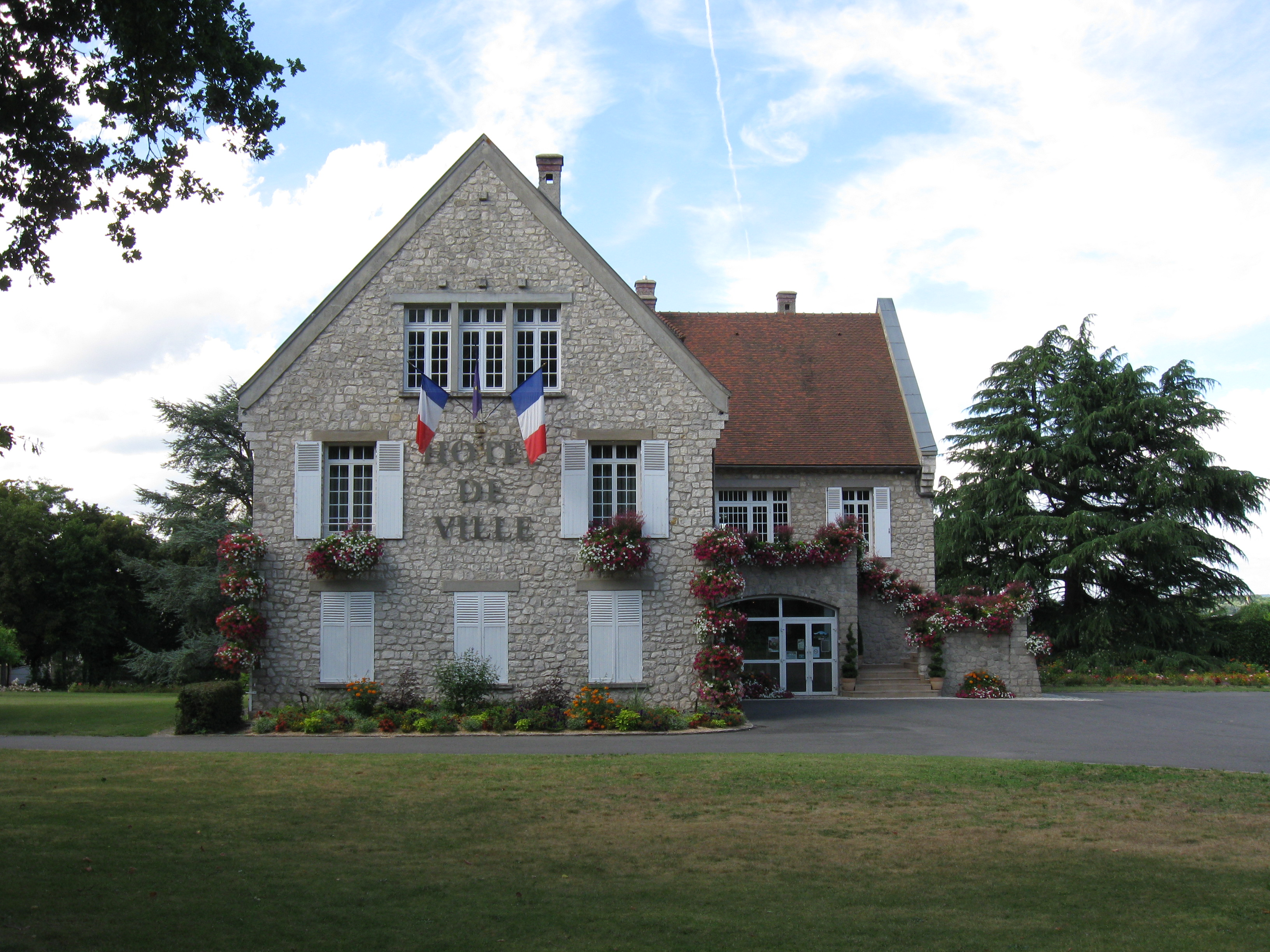
- The town hall in Saint-Pierre-lès-Nemours

- Coat of arms
- Location of Saint-Pierre-lès-Nemours
- Location within France Location within Île-de-France (region)
- Coordinates: 48°15′48″N 2°40′53″E
- Country: France
- Region: Île-de-France
- Department: Seine-et-Marne
- Arrondissement: Fontainebleau
- Canton: Nemours

Government
  - Mayor (2020–2026): Bruno Landais
- Area^{1}: 21.62 km^{2} (8.35 sq mi)
- Highest elevation: 123 m (404 ft)
- Lowest elevation: 57 m (187 ft)
- Population (2023): 5,401
  - Density: 249.8/km^{2} (647.0/sq mi)
- Time zone: UTC+01:00 (CET)
  - Summer (DST): UTC+02:00 (CEST)
- INSEE/Postal code: 77431 /77140
- ^{1} French Land Register data, which excludes lakes, ponds, glaciers > 1 km^{2} (0.386 sq mi or 247 acres) and river estuaries.

Saint-Pierre-lès-Nemours (French pronunciation: [sɛ̃ pjɛʁ lɛ nəmuʁ], literally Saint-Pierre near Nemours) is a commune in the Seine-et-Marne department in the Île-de-France region in north-central France.

== Demographics ==
Inhabitants of Saint-Pierre-lès-Nemours are called Saint-Pierrois in French.

Historical population
Year	Pop.	±% p.a.
1968	3,298	—
1975	3,713	+1.71%
1982	4,777	+3.67%
1990	5,374	+1.48%
1999	5,815	+0.88%
2007	5,742	−0.16%
2012	5,560	−0.64%
2017	5,483	−0.28%
2023	5,401	−0.25%
Source: INSEE

== Economy ==
- Île-de-France Ecotron

== Local culture and heritage ==
- Massif forestier des Rochers-Gréau on the heights of the town: twenty-two hectares of woods for hiking and climbing rocks.

== See also ==
- Communes of the Seine-et-Marne department
