= Hôtel de Ville, Nemours =

Town hall in Nemours, France

Hôtel de Ville
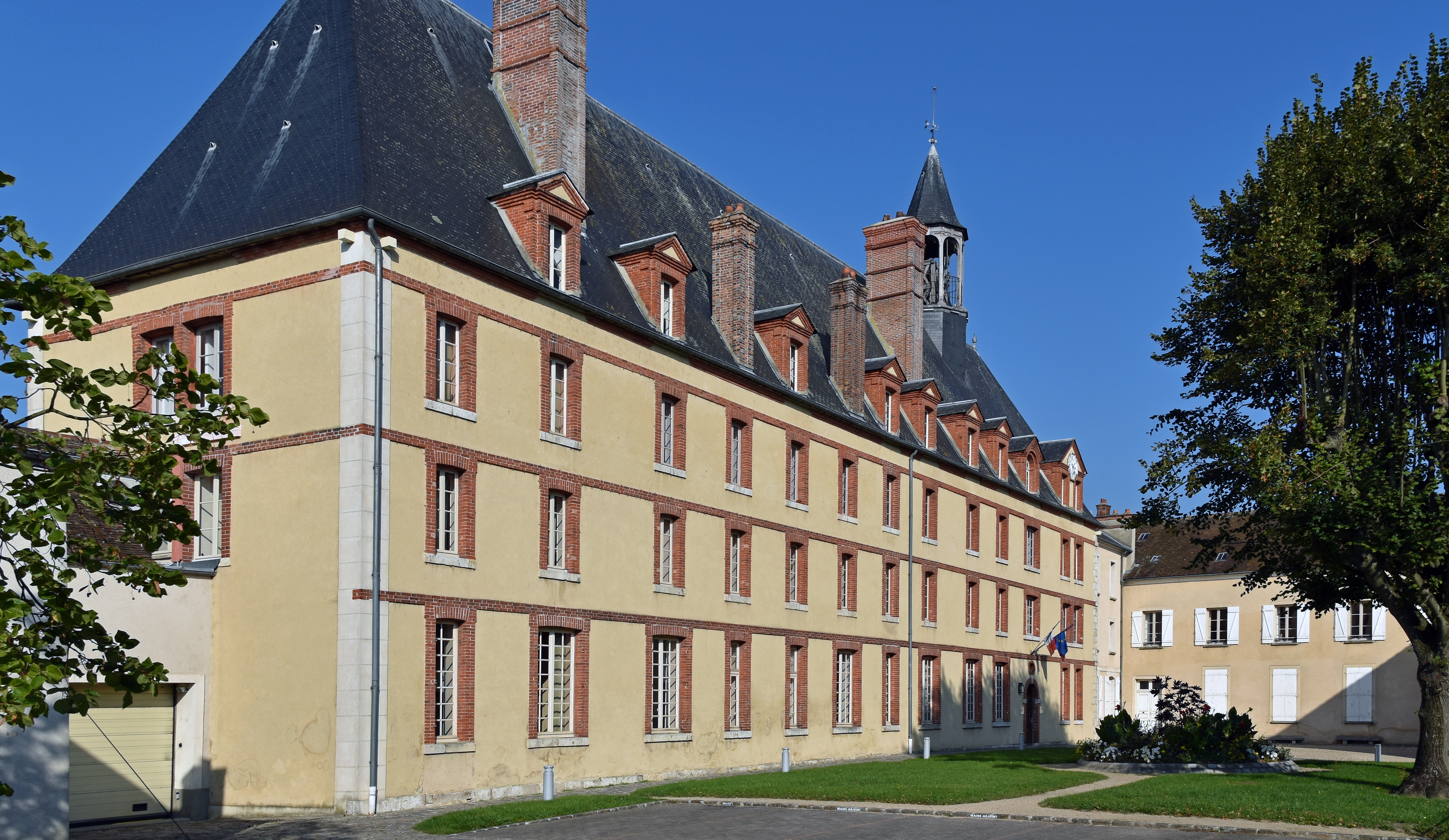
- The main frontage of the Hôtel de Ville in September 2015

General information
- Type: City hall
- Architectural style: Neoclassical style
- Location: Nemours, France
- Coordinates: 48.2666°N 2.6935°E
- Completed: 1669

Design and construction
- Architect: Jules Hardouin-Mansart

Monument historique
- Official name: Hospice (ancien)
- Type: Inscrit
- Designated: 1926
- Reference no.: PA00087164

The Hôtel de Ville (French pronunciation: [otɛl də vil], City Hall) is a municipal building in Nemours, Seine-et-Marne, northern France, standing on Rue de Docteur Chopy. It was designated a monument historique by the French government in 1926.

== History ==
The building was commissioned as a convent by a religious order, the Congrégation de Notre-Dame. The order was founded by two nuns who arrived from Joigny in around 1641. The formation of the order was authorised by Gaston, Duke of Orléans in 1646. The Congrégation de Notre-Dame was one of three religious communities operating in the town at that time, the others being the Cistercians of Notre-Dame de la Joie, which was also operated by nuns, and the Récollets, which was operated by a group of friars. The site the nuns selected was on the east bank of a section of the Loing Canal, which flows through the town.

The building was designed by Jules Hardouin-Mansart in the neoclassical style, built in brick with a cement render finish and was completed in 1669. The design involved a near-symmetrical main frontage of 13 bays facing onto what is now Rue de Docteur Chopy. The third bay on the right featured a round headed opening which formed the main access to the building. The building was fenestrated by tall casement windows on the ground, first and second floors, and by dormer windows with pediments at attic level. The first two bays on the right were set close together and, at attic level, the two windows had a single pediment containing a clock. At roof level, there was a lantern with a bell towards the north end of the building. Internally, the principal rooms included a chapel for the nuns, and there was a fine staircase with wooden balusters providing access to the rooms on the upper floors.

By 1686, the convent employed some 70 nuns supervising over 200 young girls. Following the French Revolution, the building was seized by the state and the nuns were driven out. Instead, a Hôtel-Dieu, operated by the Catholic Church, was established there for the benefit of the poor and needy in 1791. The building was appropriately divided up, so that medical services, teaching and residential care could all be provided for people arriving there.

After the Hôtel-Dieu closed in 1977, the building remained empty until it was acquired by the town council in 1985. The town council, which had previously been based at a house on Quai Victor Hugo, (Note: The house on Quai Victor Hugo was previously the home of the last descendent of the Hédelin family, which had been influential in the town for centuries, and now accommodates the Syndicat Intercommunal.) then relocated into the building. A Salle du Conseil (council chamber) was established, and the chapel was converted for use as a Salle des Mariages (wedding room).
