= Adrien Étienne Gaudez =

French sculptor

- Born: Adrien Étienne Gaudez; 2 February 1845; Lyon, France
- Died: 23 January 1902 (aged 56); Neuilly-sur-Seine, France
- Education: École des Beaux-Arts
- Known for: Sculpture
- Notable work: Memorial statue of Jean-Rodolphe Perronet; Monumental statue of Antoine-Augustin Parmentier
- Movement: Classical sculpture Art Nouveau

Adrien Étienne Gaudez (2 February 1845 – 23 January 1902) was a French sculptor who worked in the 19th century. He produced several monumental figures that were cast in bronze. Gaudez studied sculpture under the tutelage of François Jouffroy at the École des Beaux-Arts and in 1870 was a prisoner of war during the Franco-Prussian War.

== Life and career ==
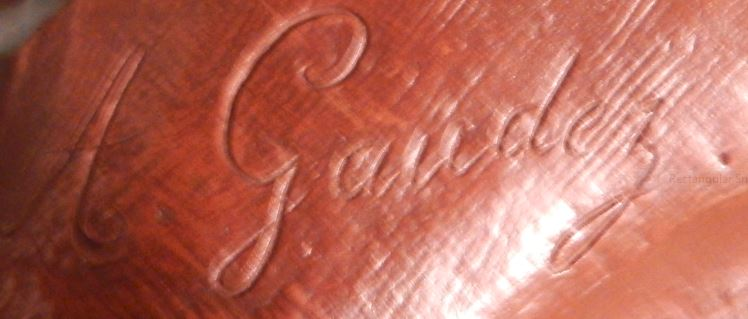
The signature of Adrien Étienne Gaudez

Gaudez was born in Lyon, France, on 2 February 1845. He was a pupil of François Jouffroy at the École des Beaux-Arts in Paris in 1862. He made his debut at the Paris Salon of 1864. Gaudez worked almost exclusively in bronze and he produced a wide array of sculptures, ranging from genre subjects to military and patriotic themes. His earlier work was mostly of a classical nature but in the latter part of his career he produced some sculpture that can be categorized as Art Nouveau.

=== Prisoner of war ===
He was a prisoner of war in the Franco-Prussian War in 1870. Having first-hand knowledge of the war, he executed a statue in memory of the French prisoners held in Magdeburg by the Prussian forces. The statue was erected in the city's cemetery. He participated in the Paris Salon of 1878 with the plaster sculpture titled Jupiter's Childhood.

=== Death and legacy ===
Gaudez died in Neuilly-sur-Seine, France, on 23 January 1902. He is best known for his monumental sculptures.

== Works ==
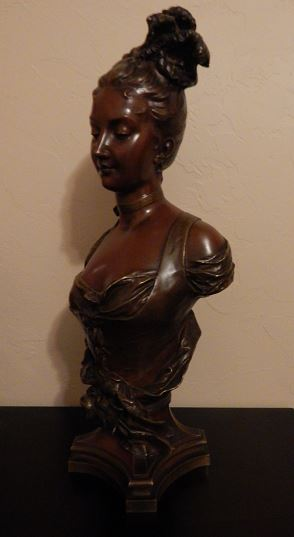
A bronze bust of a Victorian era woman by Gaudez, c. 1880

Included among the most recognizable known works of Gaudez are the following:

- Florian monument, Alès
- Memorial of the Franco-Prussian War, the dead of Remiremont County, opened by Raymond Poincaré, then Minister of Public Instruction in 1892
- Hebe statue in Neuilly-sur-Seine
- Antoine-Augustin Parmentier statue, Neuilly-sur-Seine
- Memorial statue of Jean-Rodolphe Perronet
- Glory to the Job – Gloire au travail, 1890
- The Return of the Swallows – Le retour des hirondelles
- The Law – Le Devoir
- Ferronnier XIV=Siecle
- Allegory of Science and Literature
- Bust of Louis Pasteur
- Statuette of Mozart playing the violin
- Lully as a child, 1885, plaster model, Petit Palais, Paris

== Gallery ==
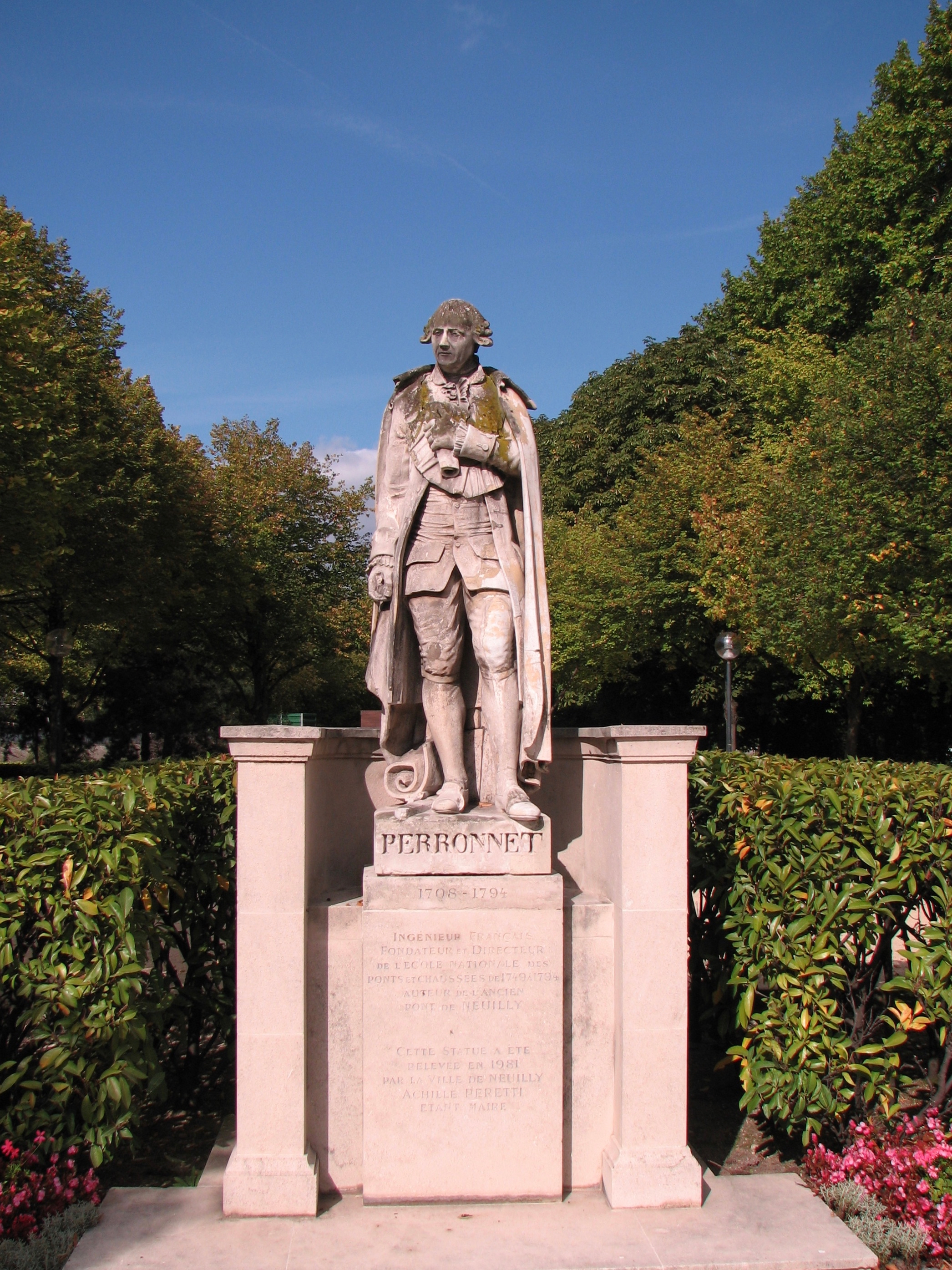
Monumental statue of
Jean-Rodolphe Perronet

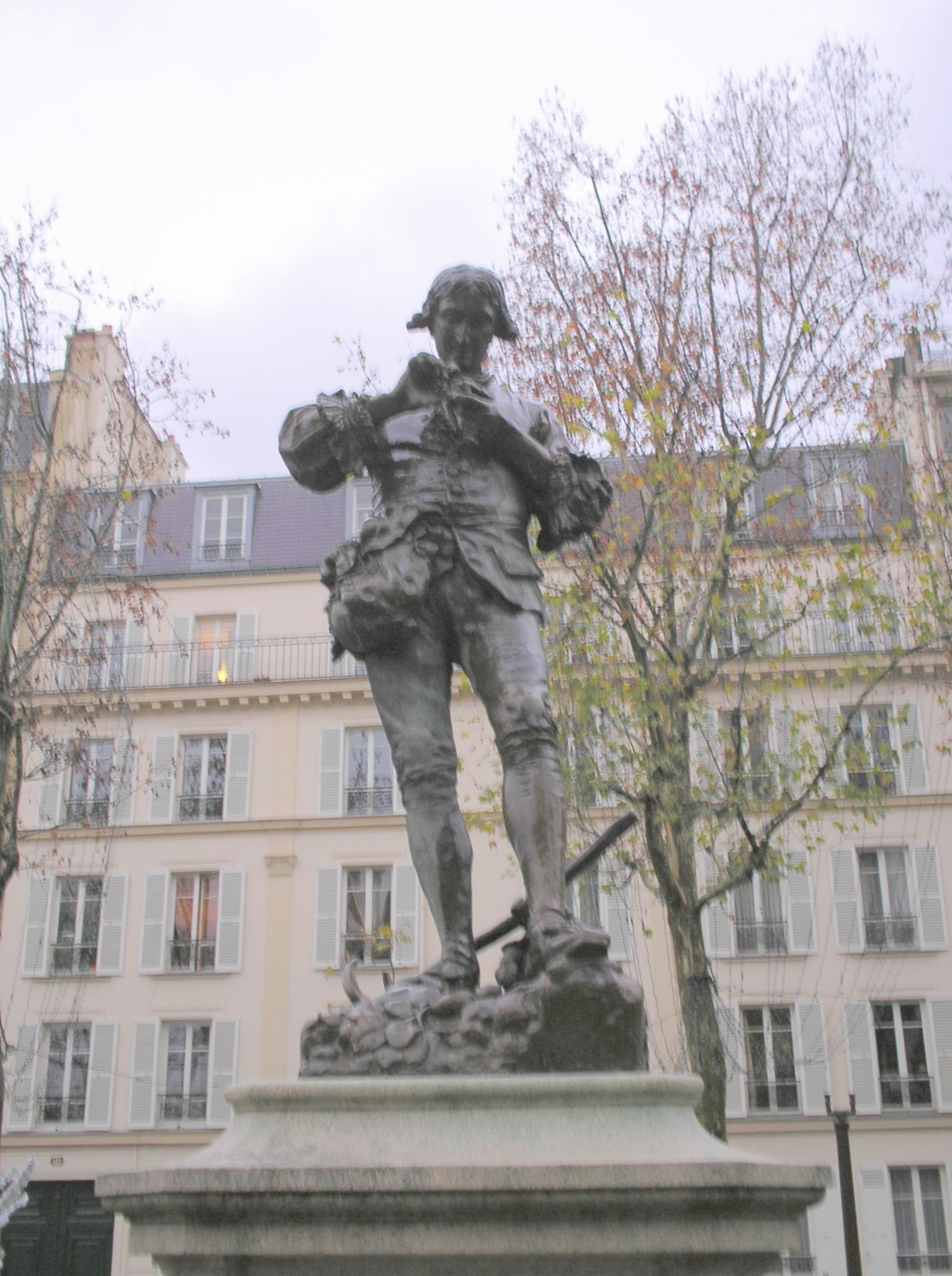
Memorial statue of
Antoine-Augustin Parmentier

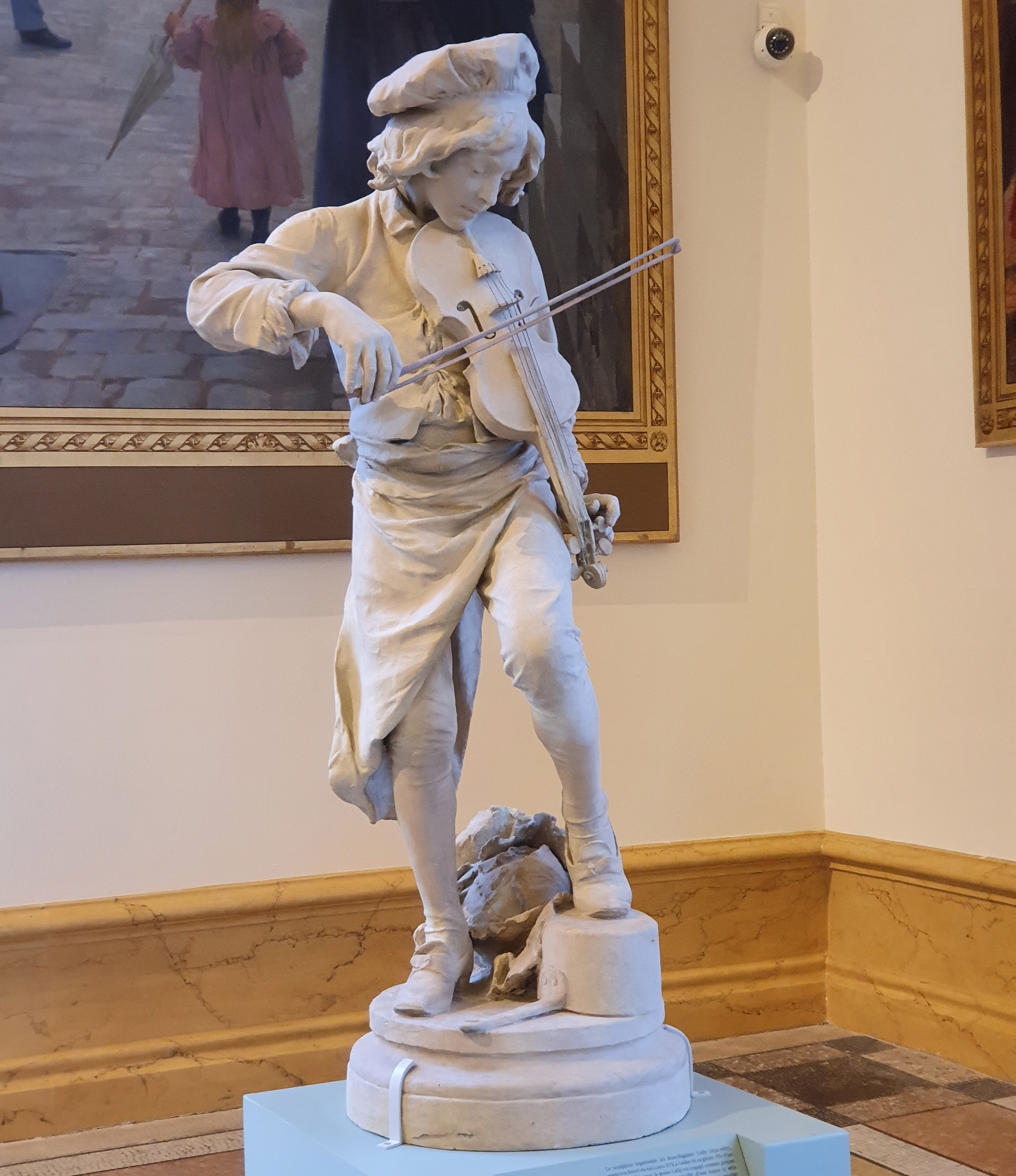
Lully as a child - 1885
Plaster model - Petit Palais - Paris
