= Antoine-Augustin Parmentier =

French pharmacist and agronomist (1737–1813)

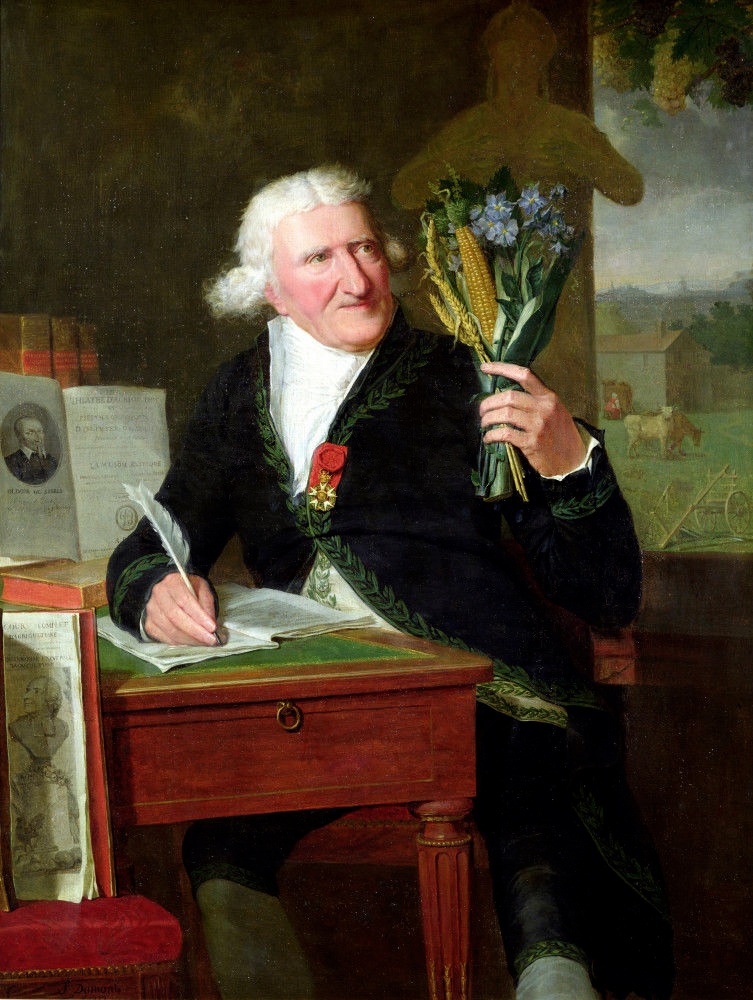
- Parmentier by François Dumont, in 1812. Behind him is an opened edition of the agronomic treatise Théâtre d'Agriculture, by Olivier de Serres
- Born: 12 August 1737; Montdidier, Somme, Kingdom of France
- Died: 17 December 1813 (aged 76); Paris, First French Empire
- Resting place: Père Lachaise Cemetery, Paris
- Citizenship: France
- Known for: Popularising potatoes in France
- Scientific career
- Fields: Agronomy, Pharmacology

Antoine-Augustin Parmentier (UK: /pɑːrˈmɛntieɪ, -ˈmɒnt-/, US: /ˌpɑːrmənˈtjeɪ/; French: [ɑ̃twan oɡystɛ̃ paʁmɑ̃tje]; 12 August 1737 – 13 December 1813) was a French pharmacist and agronomist, best remembered as a vocal promoter of the potato as a food source for humans in France and throughout Europe. His many other contributions to nutrition and health included establishing the first mandatory smallpox vaccination campaign in France (under Napoleon beginning in 1805, when he was Inspector-General of the Health Service) and pioneering the extraction of sugar from sugar beets. Parmentier also founded a school of breadmaking and studied methods of conserving food, including refrigeration.

== Life and career ==
While serving as an army pharmacist for France in the Seven Years' War, he was captured by the Prussians, and in prison in Prussia was faced with eating potatoes, known to the French only as hog feed. The potato had been introduced from South America to Europe by the Spaniards at the beginning of the 16th century. It was introduced to the rest of Europe by 1640 but (outside Spain and Ireland) was usually used only for animal feed. King Frederick II of Prussia had required peasants to cultivate the plants under severe penalties and had provided them with cuttings. There is a legend which states that France had forbidden the cultivation of the potato before Parmentier published his famous essay in 1772, but there is no primary source for this claim and there is no evidence of a ban ever having taken place in France at that time.

Following his return to Paris in 1763 he pursued his pioneering studies in nutritional chemistry. His prison experience came to mind in 1772 when he proposed (in a contest sponsored by the Academy of Besançon) use of the potato as a source of nourishment for dysenteric patients. He won the prize on behalf of the potato in 1773.

Due largely to Parmentier's efforts, the Paris Faculty of Medicine declared potatoes edible in 1772. Still, resistance continued, and Parmentier was prevented from using his test garden at the Invalides hospital, where he was pharmacist, by the religious community that owned the land, whose complaints resulted in the suppression of Parmentier's post at the Invalides.

Parmentier's agronomic interests covered a wide range of opportunities to ameliorate the human lot through technical improvements; he published his observations touching on bread-baking, cheese-making, grain storage, the use of cornmeal (maize) and chestnut flour, mushroom culture, mineral waters, wine-making, improved sea biscuits, and a host of other topics of interest to the Physiocrats. In 1779, Parmentier was appointed to teach at the Free School of Bakery to help stabilize Paris's food supply by making bread in a more cost-efficient fashion. In that same year, he published Manière de faire le pain de pommes de terre, sans mélange de farine (How to make potato bread, without mixing flour), in which he described how one can make potato bread that still has all the characteristics of wheat bread.

In 1800, Napoléon Bonaparte appointed him the first army pharmacist. He succeeded Pierre Bayen: he continued his fight to place pharmacy on the same level as medicine and surgery.

=== Potato advocacy ===
Parmentier engaged advocacy efforts to educate the public on the value of potatoes as a staple food crop. He hosted dinners at which potato dishes featured prominently and attended by famous guests such as Benjamin Franklin and Antoine Lavoisier.

He gave bouquets of potato blossoms to the king and queen and was granted 54 arpents of impoverished ground near Neuilly, west of Paris, to demonstrate the potato's suitability for growing in poor soil conditions. Julien-Joseph Virey posthumously attributed an existing apocryphal anecdote to Parmentier, claiming he had used the experimental fields as form of reverse psychology (allowing guards to take bribes and leave at night to prompt curious farmer's to "steal" cuttings). This is almost certainly not true, as the same ruse has been attributed to several other historical figures throughout history.

In 1771, Parmentier won an essay contest in which all the judges voted the potato as the best substitute for ordinary flour. This was before a time when France needed a replacement for wheat, so Parmentier continued to face criticism and lack of acknowledgment for his work. The first step in the acceptance of the potato in French society was a year of bad harvests, 1785, when the scorned potatoes staved off famine in the north of France. In 1789, Parmentier published Treatise on the Culture and Use of the Potato, Sweet Potato, and Jerusalem Artichoke (Traité sur la culture et les usages des Pommes de terre, de la Patate, et du Topinambour), "printed by order of the king", giving royal backing to potato eating, albeit on the eve of the French Revolution, leaving it up to the Republicans to accept it. In 1794, Madame Mérigot published La Cuisinière Républicaine (The [Female] Republican Cook), the first potato cookbook, promoting potatoes as food for the common people.

== Death and legacy ==
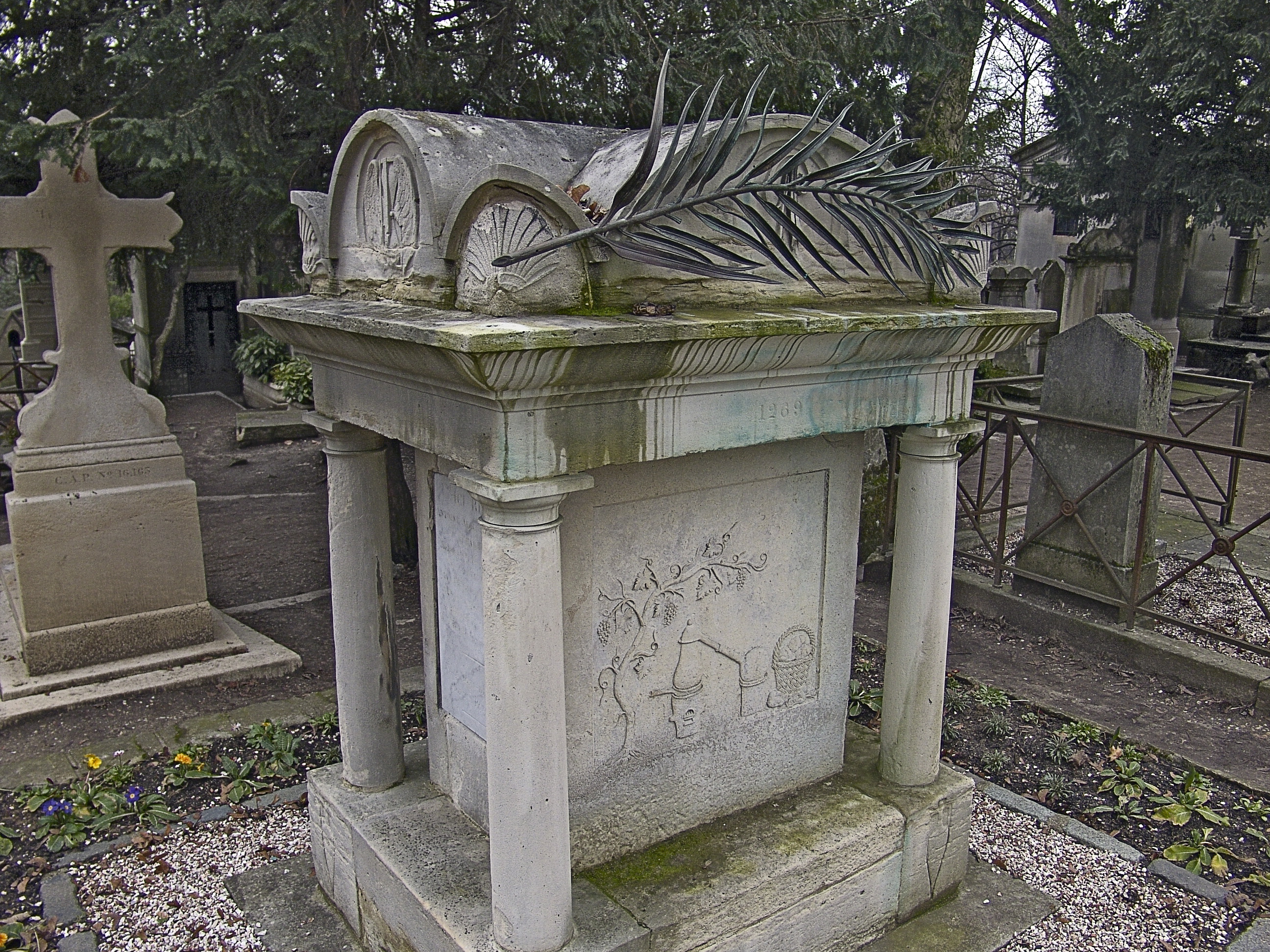
Tomb of Antoine Parmentier – Père Lachaise Cemetery

Parmentier died on 13 December 1813, aged 76. He is buried in Père Lachaise Cemetery in Paris, in a plot ringed by potato plants, and his name is given to a long avenue in the 10th and 11th arrondissements (and a station on line 3 of the Paris Métro). At Montdidier, his bronze statue surveys Place Parmentier from its high socle, while below, in full marble relief, seed potatoes are distributed to a grateful peasant. Another monumental statue of Parmentier, by French sculptor Adrien Étienne Gaudez, is erected in the square of the town hall of Neuilly-sur-Seine.

Starting in the 1870s, many dishes including potatoes were named in honor of Parmentier: potage, velouté, or crème Parmentier, a potato and leek soup; hachis Parmentier, a cottage or shepherd's pie; brandade de morue parmentier, salt cod mashed with olive oil and potatoes; pommes or garniture Parmentier, cubed potatoes fried in butter; purée Parmentier, mashed potatoes; salade Parmentier, potato salad.
