= Pierre Bayen =

French chemist (1725–1798)

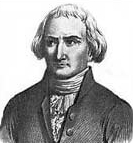
- Born: 7 February 1725; Châlons-sur-Marne, France
- Died: 15 February 1798 (aged 73); Paris, France
- Occupation: Chemist

Pierre Bayen (7 February 1725–14 February 1798) was a French chemist (apothecary). He analysed the mineral waters consumed in the Kingdom of France and incorrectly concluded that drinking from pewter vessels rendered the water toxic.

After his studies he began a career in the military that spanned more than forty years.

During the Seven Years' War he met and befriended Parmentier who was his subordinate.

- Bayen was a member of the College de Pharmacie from around 1766.
- Bayen became a member of the French Academy of Sciences in 1785 and the Institut de France in 1795. He burned all his papers during the Reign of Terror of 1793-1794.
- Bayen became the Inspector General of the Health Services in 1796.

== Legacy ==
- Bayen is credited as the father of Military Pharmacy.
- There is a road in Paris and in Chalons named after him.
- The Lycée Pierre Bayen in Chalons was named in his memory.
