= Centre hospitalier Sud Seine et Marne =

Geography
- Location: Fontainebleau, Montereau-Fault-Yonne, Nemours, Île-de-France, France
- Coordinates: 48.41078567504883°N 2.69689679145813°E

Organisation
- Type: Teaching

Services
- Emergency department: Yes
- Beds: 1320

History
- Opened: January 2017

Links
- Website: www.ch-sud-seine-et-marne.fr
- Lists: Hospitals in France

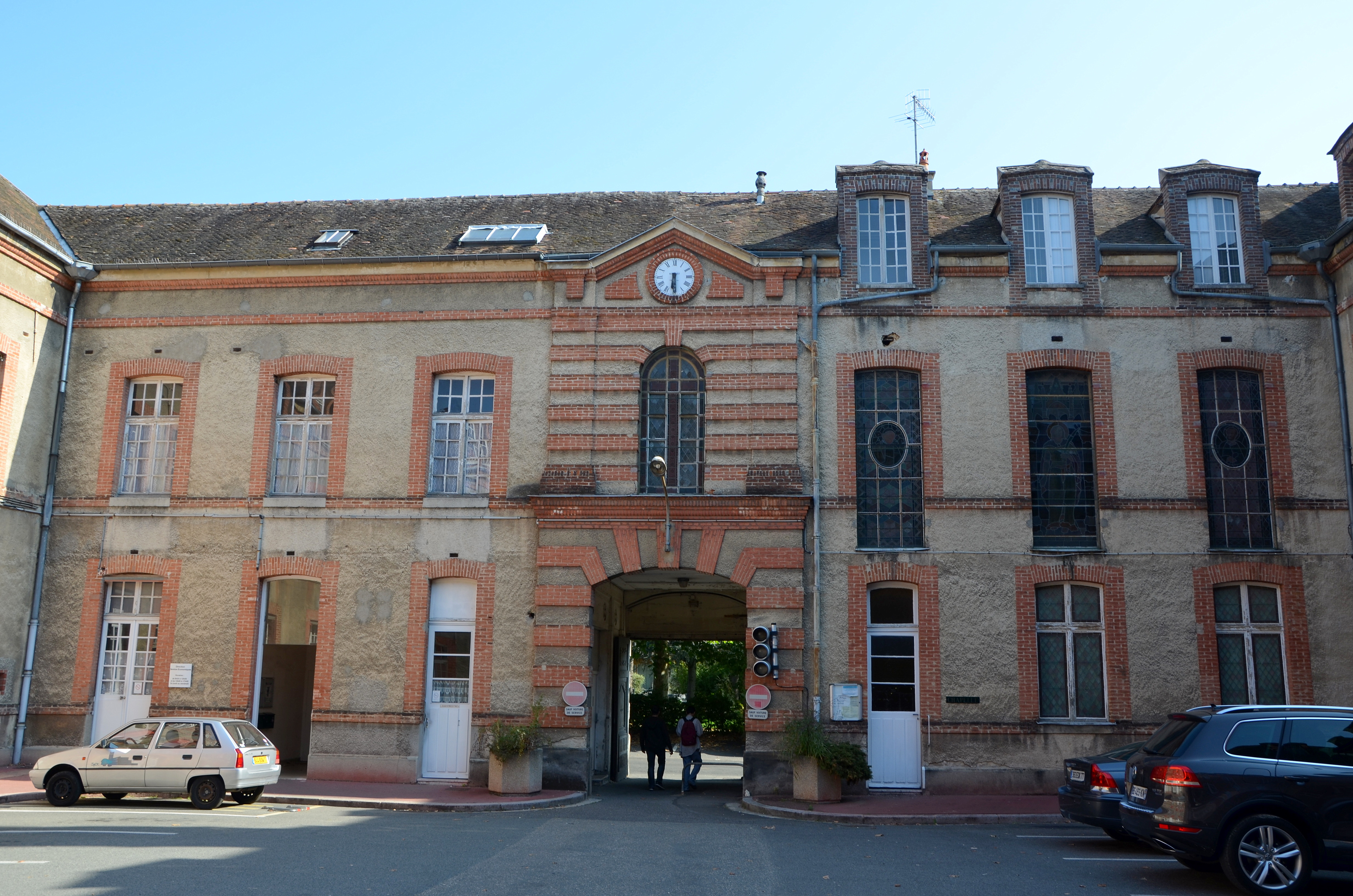
Fontainebleau campus

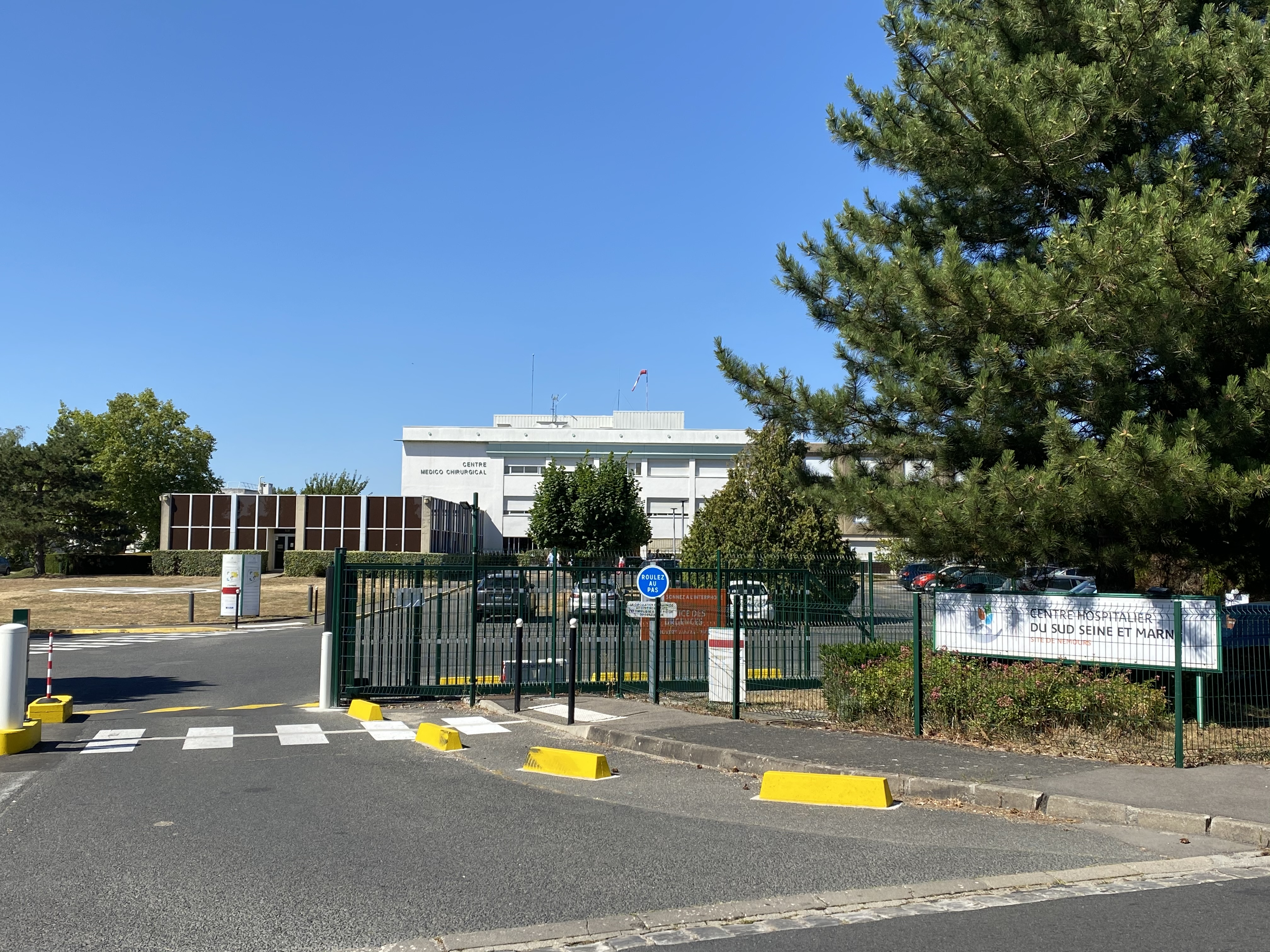
Nemours campus

The Centre hospitalier Sud Seine et Marne is a teaching hospital in Fontainebleau, Montereau-Fault-Yonne and Nemours in France. It is a teaching hospital of Paris-Est Créteil University.

It is a result of the merger of three hospitals in each of the above cities.

It was established in January 2017.
