= Grand pont de Nemours =

Bridge in France

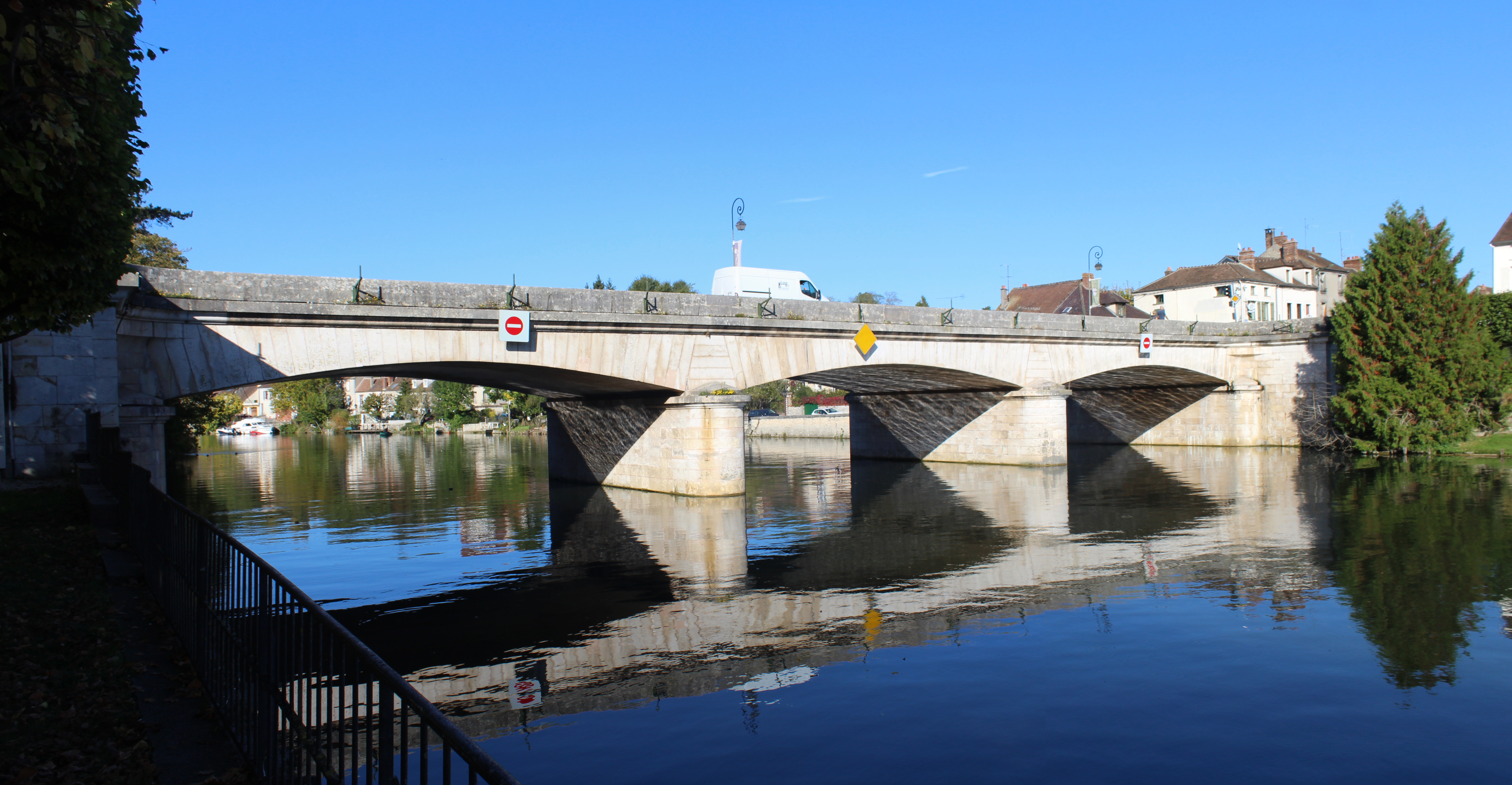
- Grand pont de Nemours
- Coordinates: 48°16′3″N 2°41′53″E
- Carries: Road traffic and pedestrians
- Crosses: River Loing
- Locale: Nemours, Seine-et-Marne, France
- Maintained by: Commune of Nemours

Characteristics
- Design: Stone arch bridge
- Total length: 48.75 m (159.9 ft)
- Width: 24.48 m (80.3 ft)
- Longest span: 16.25 m (53.3 ft)

History
- Opened: 1804

Location
- Interactive map of Grand pont de Nemours

The Grand pont de Nemours (French pronunciation: [ɡʁɑ̃ pɔ̃ də nəmur]; Great Bridge of Nemours), also called the Grand pont de la Fraternité (French pronunciation: [ɡʁɑ̃ pɔ̃ də la fʁatɛʁnite]; Great Bridge of Fraternity), is a vaulted arch bridge in southern Nemours, a commune in the Seine-et-Marne department of the Île-de-France region of France.

It was completed in 1804 and designed by the French architect Jean-Rodolphe Perronet. The bridge was listed as a historical monument in 1926 and is one of only two surviving bridges by Perronet.

== History ==
After a flood swept away the original bridge of Nemours in 1770, the French architect and engineer Jean-Rodolphe Perronet was commissioned to design and construct a new bridge in 1771. After a period of delays from financial constraints, construction began in 1795, a year after Perronet's death. The project was continued by architect Louis-Claude Boistard (1762–1823) under the direction of chief engineer Jean-Baptiste Dherbelot and construction engineer Claude-Raphaël Duvivier. Construction was completed in 1804, nearly a decade later but in time for the passage of Pope Pius VII on November 21, 1804.

The bridge features three vaults made of stone masonry built over the Loing, a tributary of the Seine. The low arches each span 16.25 meters (53 ft) and are typical of Perronet's style, which used the segmental arches to combine structural integrity with visual levity. In the Nemours bridge, he reduced the arch ratio of rise to span to 1/15 of the span, a figure difficult to surpass with stone masonry, and the bridge featured his lowest arches.

In 1862, the foundations for the Nemours bridge were cut down to at least 2 meters (6.5 ft) below the lowest water level at an expense of two hundred thousand francs to lower the water plane. The bridge was listed as a historical monument on March 19, 1926.

== Modern day ==
The Nemours bridge is in the southern part of Nemours, located 70 km (43 miles) south of Paris. The commune is served by a second bridge to the north, the Pont Charles Hochart, which also crosses the Loing.

The Nemours bridge is one of only two surviving bridges designed by Perronet, along with the Concorde in Paris. The remainder were destroyed, either in wartime, as with the Neuilly or Pont St.-Maxence, or demolished for widening in the early to mid-twentieth century.

== In popular culture ==
The du Pont family, a prominent American industrial dynasty, takes its name from the bridge. The family is descended from the French aristocrat Pierre Samuel du Pont de Nemours (1739–1817), who adopted the suffix de Nemours (“of Nemours”) to his surname after being ennobled by King Louis XVI in 1784. This addition was also intended to prevent confusion with two other Duponts in the French Chamber of Deputies.

The bridge is the location of an accident in the 1804 novel Ursule Mirouët by Honoré de Balzac.

== See also ==
- Nemours
- List of bridges in France
