= Jean-Rodolphe Perronet =

French architect and structural engineer (1708–1794)

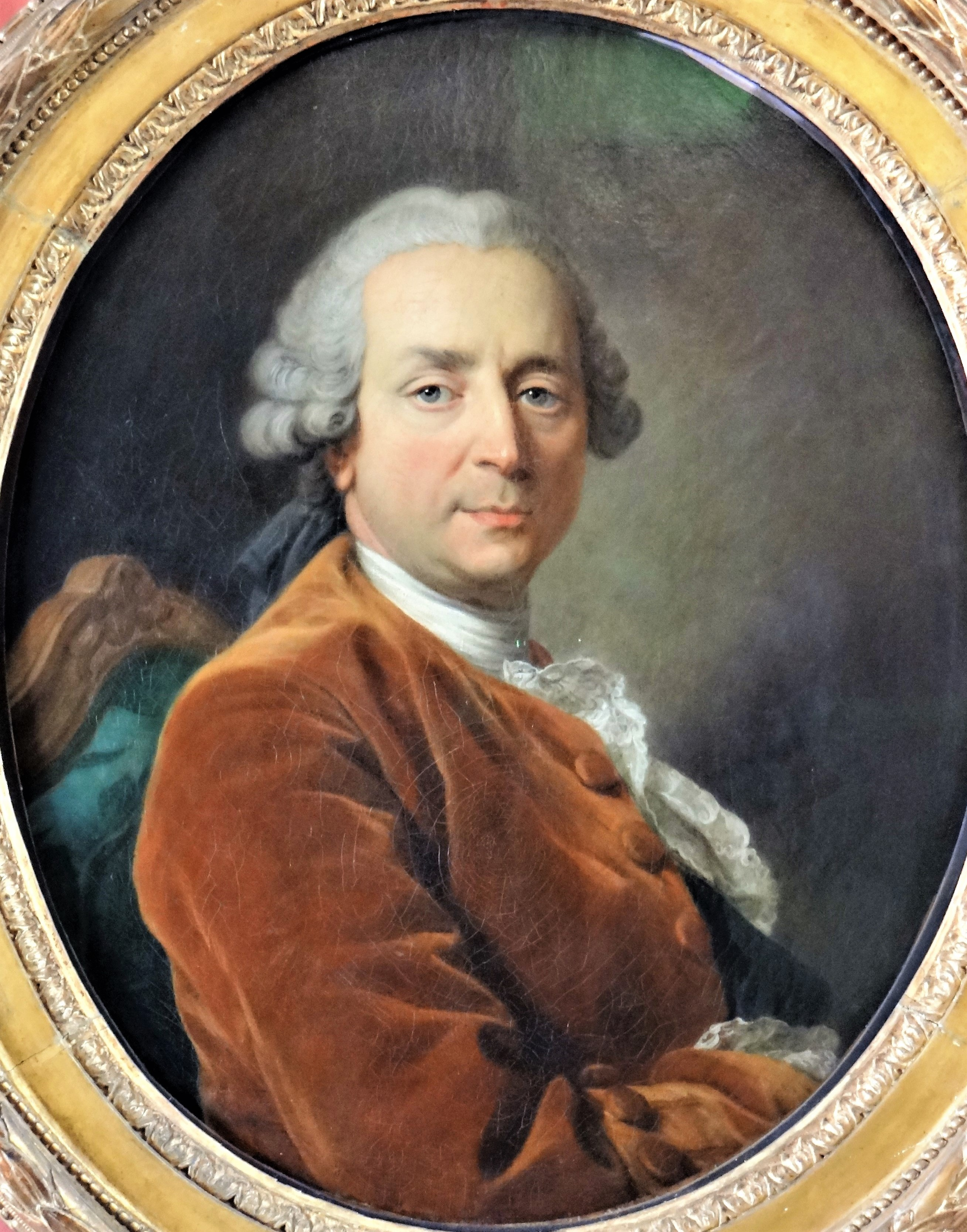
- Portrait by Louis-Michel van Loo, 1764
- Born: 8 October 1708; Suresnes, Kingdom of France
- Died: 27 February 1794 (aged 85); Paris, French Republic
- Engineering career
- Projects: Pont de la Concorde
- Significant advance: arch bridges

Jean-Rodolphe Perronet (French: [ʒɑ̃ ʁɔdɔlf pɛʁɔnɛ]; 8 October 1708 – 27 February 1794) was a French architect and structural engineer known for his many stone arch bridges. His best-known work is the Pont de la Concorde (1787).

== Early life ==
Perronet was born in Suresnes, a suburb of Paris, on 8 October 1708. He was the son of David Perronet, a Swiss Guardsman from Château-d'Œx, and Marie Travers. His father later became a wine merchant and abjured Protestantism in 1709. At age 17, Perronet entered the architectural practice of Jean-Baptiste-Augustin Beausire, an engineer and maître des bâtiments to the city of Paris, as an apprentice. He was put in charge of the design and construction of Paris's grand sewer, embankment works, and the maintenance of the banlieue's roads. In 1735, he was named sous-ingénieur (under-engineer) to Alençon and in 1736 entered the Corps des ponts et chaussées. In 1737, he became sous-ingénieur, then engineer to the généralité of Alençon.

== Career ==
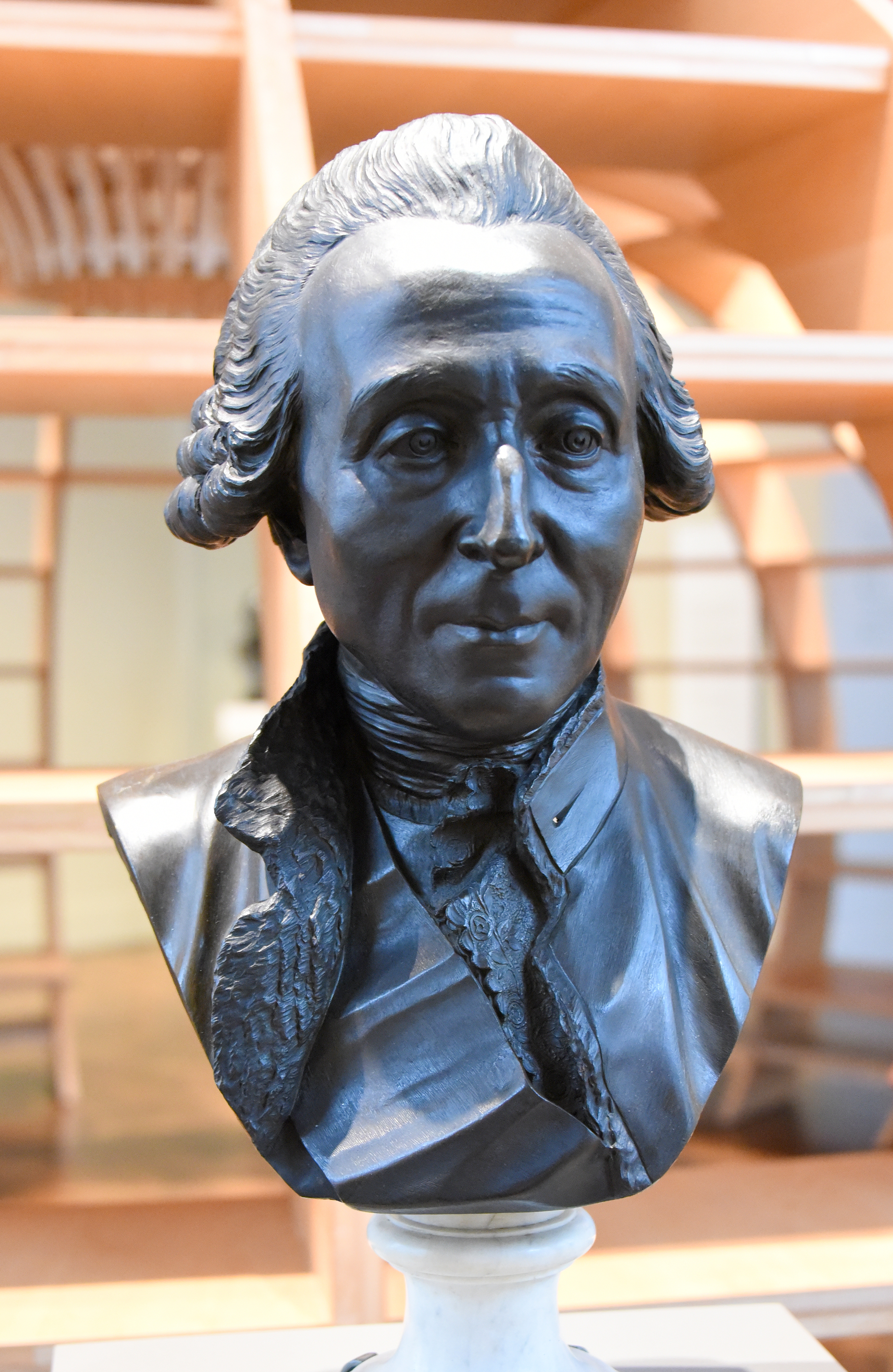
Bust of Jean-Rodolphe Perronet, 1785 CE. From Paris, France. By Jean-Baptiste Pigalle. The Victoria and Albert Museum, London

In 1747, Perronet was named director of the Bureau des dessinateurs du Roi (Royal Office of Designers), which had also just put Daniel-Charles Trudaine in charge of producing maps and plans for the kingdom. This first École des ponts et chaussées was based in the hôtel Libéral Bruant in Paris. Perronet was given the task of training bridge and road engineers and overseeing their work in the généralités in which they worked. The Bureau became the Bureau des élèves des ponts et chaussées, then in 1775 was renamed the École des ponts et chaussées. Perronet was to direct it for the rest of his life. As its organizer, inspiration, and teacher, Perronet was his students' spiritual father and used a new teaching method that seems very contemporary to modern eyes. During this time, he became friends with the Swiss bridge-builder Charles Labelye.

In 1750, Perronet was promoted to inspector general (inspecteur général), and by 1763, he had become first engineer for bridges (Premier ingénieur du Roi). Perronet became a member of the Académie des sciences in 1765. Besides his bridges, between 1747 and 1791, 2500 km of roads were created or repaired under his direction. He also contributed the article Pompe à feu (fire-engine) to the Encyclopédie ou Dictionnaire raisonné des sciences, des arts et des métiers.

In 1772, Perronet was elected a foreign member of the Royal Swedish Academy of Sciences. He died in Paris on 27 February 1794, aged 85. He was elected a Fellow of the Royal Society in 1788.

== Death and legacy ==
He died on 27 February 1794 in Paris, aged 85. The street next to the site of the École des ponts et chaussées (delimiting Paris's 6th and 7th arrondissements) is now named after him and a statue of him, sculpted by Adrien Étienne Gaudez, has been erected on the northeast corner of the Île de Puteaux, at the foot of the pont de Neuilly (whose first stone version, built in 1772 and surviving until 1942, was his work).

== Works ==
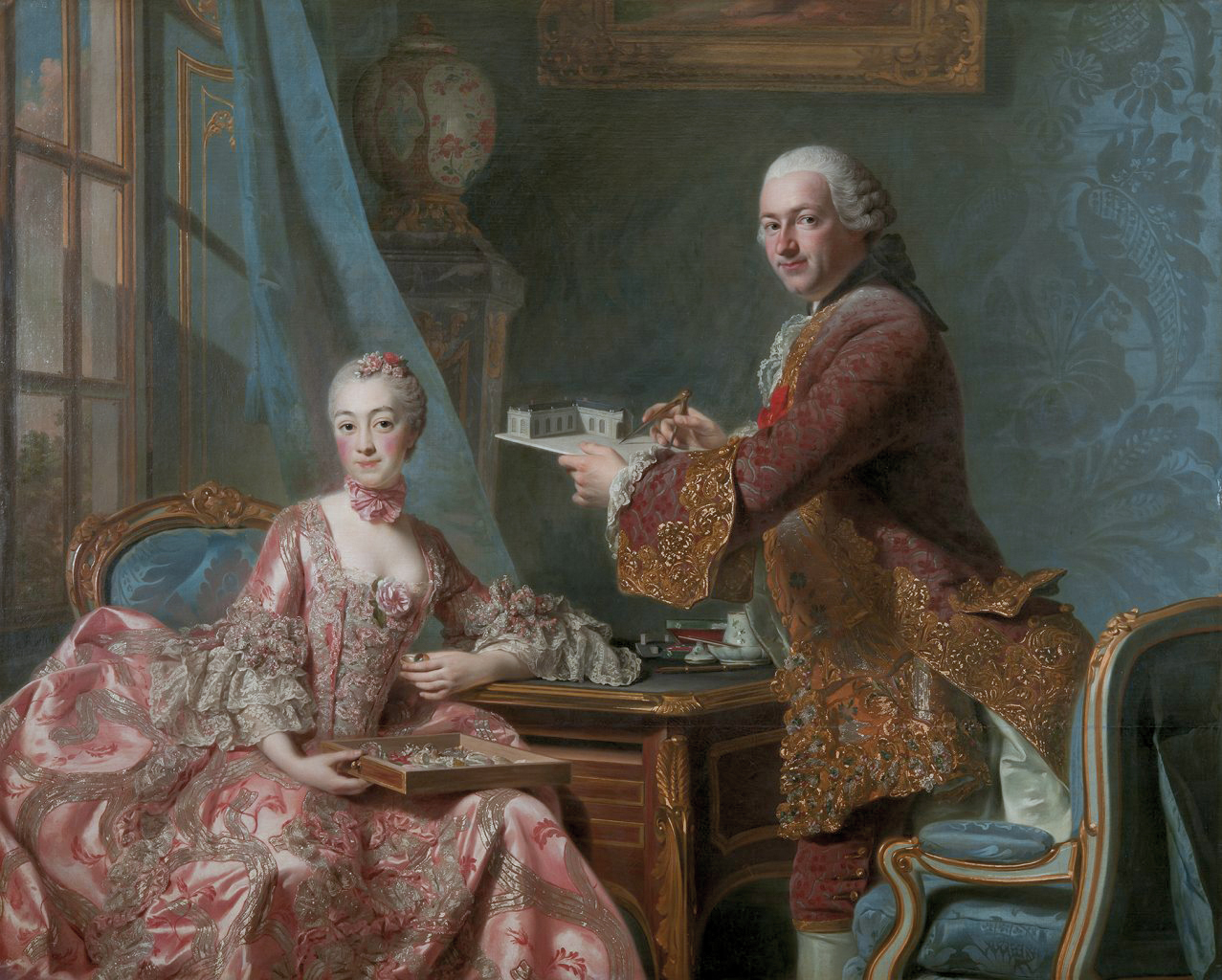
Double portrait possibly of Architect Jean-Rodolphe Perronet with his Wife Antoinette Charlotte Besson by Alexander Roslin (1759), Gothenburg Museum of Art

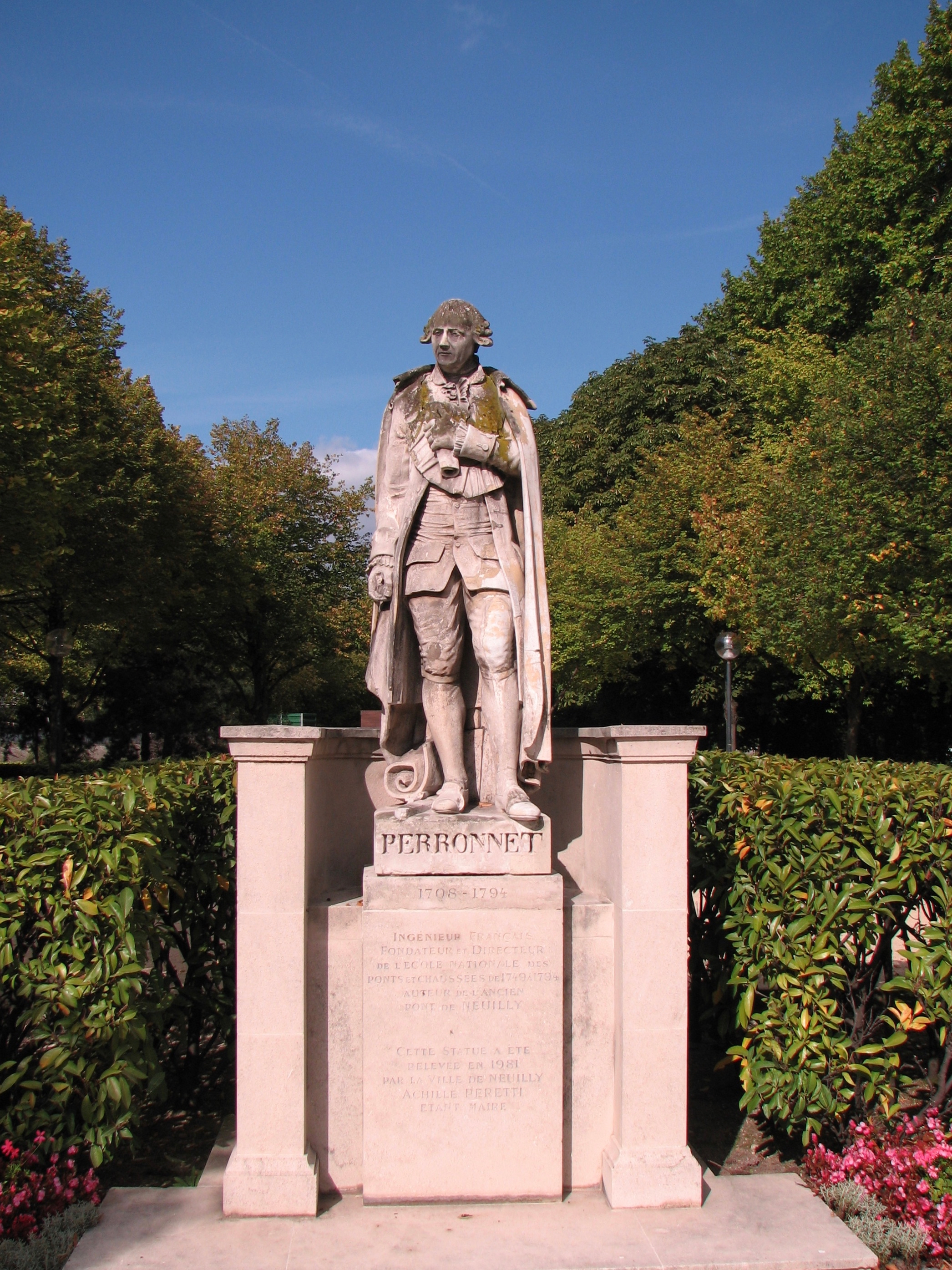
A monumental statue of Jean-Rodolphe Perronet by Adrien Étienne Gaudez

- 1750–1760 – Bridge at Orléans
- 1757–1765 – Bridge at Mantes
- 1758–1764 – Bridge at Trilport
- 1765–1786 – Bridge at Château-Thierry
- 1766–1769 – Pont Saint-Edne at Nogent
- 1768–1774 – Bridge at Neuilly-sur-Seine
- 1770–1771 – Pont Les Fontaines
- 1774–1785 – Bridge at Sainte-Maxence sur l'Oise
- 1775 – Bridge at Biais-Bicheret
- 1776–1791 – Grand pont de Nemours
- 1776- – Bridge at Mirepoix, Ariege
- 1784–1787 – Bridge at Brunoy
- 1786–1787 – Bridge at Rosoy
- 1786–1791 – Pont Louis XVI, later renamed Pont de la Concorde, Paris

== Sources ==
- (in French) Guy Coriono, 250 ans de l’École des Ponts en cent portraits, Paris, Presses de l’École nationale des Ponts et Chaussées, 1997, p. 37 and following.
- (in French) M. Guillot, "Un destin helvétique, Jean-Rodophe Perronet et sa famille suresnoise (1708–1794)" in Les gardes suisses et leurs familles au XVIIe et XVIIIe siècles en région parisienne, p. 108–116.
- (in French) Yvon Michel, "Jean-Rodolphe Perronet (1708–1794)" in Monuments Historiques, Paris, April–June 1987, nos 150–151, p. 81–86.
- (in French) Claude Vacant, Jean-Rodolphe Perronet (1708–1794). Premier inégénieur du Roi et directeur de l'École des ponts et chaussées, Paris, Presses de l'École Nationale des Ponts et Chaussées, 2006. 24 cm, 344 p., ill.
