= Château de Challeau =

French castles

Coordinates: 48°19′17″N 2°51′48″E

The Château de Challeau (or Challuau) refers to two châteaux in the neighbouring communes of Dormelles and Villecerf, near Fontainebleau in the department of Seine et Marne, France.

The first Château de Challeau was a fortified building built in the 11th century to 12th century. It has a 6m high and 1.3m thick curtain wall which surrounds an area approximately 30m by 24m, with rounded watchtowers at the corners. Unusually, it did not have a central keep, and internal buildings seem to have been limited to temporary shelters. It was modified in the 15th century, during the Hundred Years War. After the French Revolution, it was confiscated as a bien national and sold to Guillot de Blancheville. It was recovered by the descendants of its original owners in 1937, and restored.

The second château was built near Fontainebleau in 1540s, for Anne de Pisseleu, duchesse d'Étampes, mistress of Francis I of France, to a design by Pierre Chambiges. Chambiges later created the first Château de la Muette with a similar design.

Anne de Pisseleu's niece, Marguerite Hurault, sold Dormelles and Challeau to Pierre Le Charron, a courtier of King Henry IV, in the 17th century, and it was altered to become the home of Gabrielle d'Estrées (for Voltaire composed his poem La Henriade). Louis XIII later permitted Claude Le Charron to commemorate his term as French ambassador at the Castel Sant'Angelo in Rome by renaming the castle as the Château de Saint-Ange. The château was destroyed in 1803, and a new building was later built on the grounds, also known as the Château de Saint-Ange.

The park around the ruins was given protected status in 1951.
