= Algatron =

The Algatron was a proposed and prototyped waste filtration and recycling system to be implemented on NASA missions. Designed and built by a pair of sanitary engineers at the University of California, Berkeley, William J. Oswald and Clarence Golueke, the Algatron relied on algae to provide carbon Dioxide absorption and oxygen generation as well as "microbiological waste conversion" for "humans sealed within an isolated capsule.". A working model was built by Oswald and Golueke in 1965 or 1966 under a contract from the Air Force Cambridge Research Laboratories. Composed of two stacked cylinders lined with Algae, the cylinders would spin in opposite directions. With ports to allow sunlight in, nutrients (the waste and urine) were introduced via some overflow mechanism. Despite the promise that the Algatron represented, and the ways in which Oswald and Golueke "understood that the closed environment of the space capsule was itself just the a microcosm of the closed system of the earth's biosphere," the technology would never get past the prototype stage. NASA instead decided to go with fecal bags to deal with waste. The Russians developed a similar system, the BIOS-3, which got as far as a successful test run with human occupants in 1965.

== See also ==
- Assimitron
- Biotron (disambiguation)
- Eggatron
- Phytotron
