= Bioregenerative life support system =

Artificial ecosystem

Bioregenerative life support systems (BLSS) are artificial ecosystems consisting of many complex symbiotic relationships among higher plants, animals, and microorganisms. As the most advanced life support technology, BLSS can provide a habitation environment similar to Earth's biosphere for space missions with extended durations, in deep space, and with multiple crews. These systems consist of artificial ecosystems into which plants and microorganisms that allow oxygen production, carbon dioxide fixation of carbon, water purification, waste recycling, and production of foods. In these systems, photosynthetic organisms would be used as plants and algae that provide biomass for food and oxygen, as well as microorganisms that degrade and recycle waste compounds generated by human activity, as well as unused plant debris in food.

== See also ==
- Life support system – Technology that allows survival in hostile environments
- Biosphere 2 – Closed ecological research centre in Arizona
- BIOS-3 – Closed ecosystem at the Institute of Biophysics in Krasnoyarsk, Russia
- Yuegong-1 – Chinese research facility for developing a Moon base
- MELiSSA – European Space Agency led consortium developing life support systems for space missions
- Closed ecological system – Ecosystem that does not exchange matter with the exterior
