= Controlled ecological life-support system =

Technology on Space Stations & Closed Ecosystems

Controlled (or closed) ecological life-support systems (acronym CELSS) are self-supporting life-support systems for space stations and colonies typically through controlled closed ecological systems, such as the BioHome, BIOS-3, Biosphere 2, Mars Desert Research Station, and Yuegong-1.

== Original concept ==
CELSS was first pioneered by the Soviet Union during the famed "Space Race" in the 1950s–60s. Originated by Konstantin Tsiolkovsky and furthered by V.I. Vernadsky, the first forays into this science were the use of closed, uncrewed ecosystems, expanding into the research facility known as the BIOS-3.

Then in 1965, crewed experiments began in the BIOS-3.

== Rationale ==
Human presence in space, thus far, has been limited to the Earth–Moon system. Also, everything that astronauts would need in the way of life support (air, water, and food) has been brought with them. This may be feasible for short missions of spacecraft, but it is not the most viable solution when dealing with the life-support systems of a long-term craft (such as a generation ship) or a settlement.

The aim of CELSS is to create a regenerative environment that can support and maintain human life via agricultural means.

== Components of CELSS ==
=== Air revitalization ===
In non-CELSS environments, air replenishment and CO_{2} processing typically consists of stored air tanks and CO_{2} scrubbers. The drawback to this method lies in the fact that upon depletion the tanks would have to be refilled; the scrubbers would also require replacement after they become ineffective.

There is also the issue of processing toxic fumes, which come from the synthetic materials used in the construction of habitats. Therefore, the issue of how air quality is maintained requires attention; in experiments, it was found that the plants also removed volatile organic compounds offgassed by synthetic materials used thus far to build and maintain all man-made habitats.

In CELSS, air is initially supplied by external supply, but is maintained by the use of foliage plants, which create oxygen in photosynthesis (aided by the waste-byproduct of human respiration, CO_{2}). Eventually, the main goal of a CELSS environment is to have foliage plants take over the complete and total production of oxygen needs; this would make the system a closed, instead of controlled, system.

=== Food / consumables production ===
As with all present forays into space, crews have had to store all consumables they require prior to launch. Typically, hard-food consumables were freeze dried so that the craft's weight could be reduced.

Of course, in a self-sustaining ecosystem, a place for crops to grow would be set aside, allowing foods to be grown and cultivated. The larger the group of people, the more crops would have to be grown.

As for water, experiments have shown that it would be derived from condensate in the air (a byproduct of air conditioning and vapors), as well as excess moisture from plants. It would then have to be filtered by some means, either by nature or by machine.

=== Waste-water treatment ===
Early space-flight had travelers either ejecting their wastes into space or storing it for a return trip.

CELSS studied means of breaking down human wastes and, if possible, integrating the processed products back into the ecology. For instance, urine was processed into water, which was safe for use in toilets and watering plants.

Wastewater treatment makes use of plants, particularly aquatic, to process the wastewater. It has been shown that the more waste is treated by the aquatic plants (or, more specifically, their root systems), the larger the aquatic plants grow.

In tests, such as those done in the BioHome, the plants also made viable compost as a growth medium for crops.

== Closed versus controlled ==
Closed systems are totally self-reliant, recycling everything indefinitely with no external interaction. The life of such a system is limited, as the entropy of a closed system can only increase with time. But if the otherwise closed system is allowed to accept high-temperature radiant energy from an external source (e.g., sunlight) and to reject low-temperature waste heat to deep space, it can continue indefinitely. An example of such a system is the Earth itself.

Controlled systems, by contrast, depend on certain external interactions such as periodic maintenance. An example of such a system is the ISS.

== Notable CELSS projects ==
- BioHome
- Biosphere 2
- BIOS-3
- Biosphere J
- Controlled Environment Systems Research Facility
- Biotron (disambiguation)
- Biotron Experimental Climate Change Research Facility
- ALS-NSCORT - Advanced Life Support - NASA Specialized Center of Research and Training

== Other types of regenerative ecological systems ==
- Bioregenerative life support system (acronym: BLSS)
- Environmental Control and Life Support System (acronym ECLSS)
- Engineered Closed/Controlled EcoSystem (acronym ECCES)
- Spome

== See also ==
- Life-support system
- Closed ecological system
- Arcology
