= Josef Gitelson =

Russian biophysicist (1928–2022)

- Иосиф Гительзон
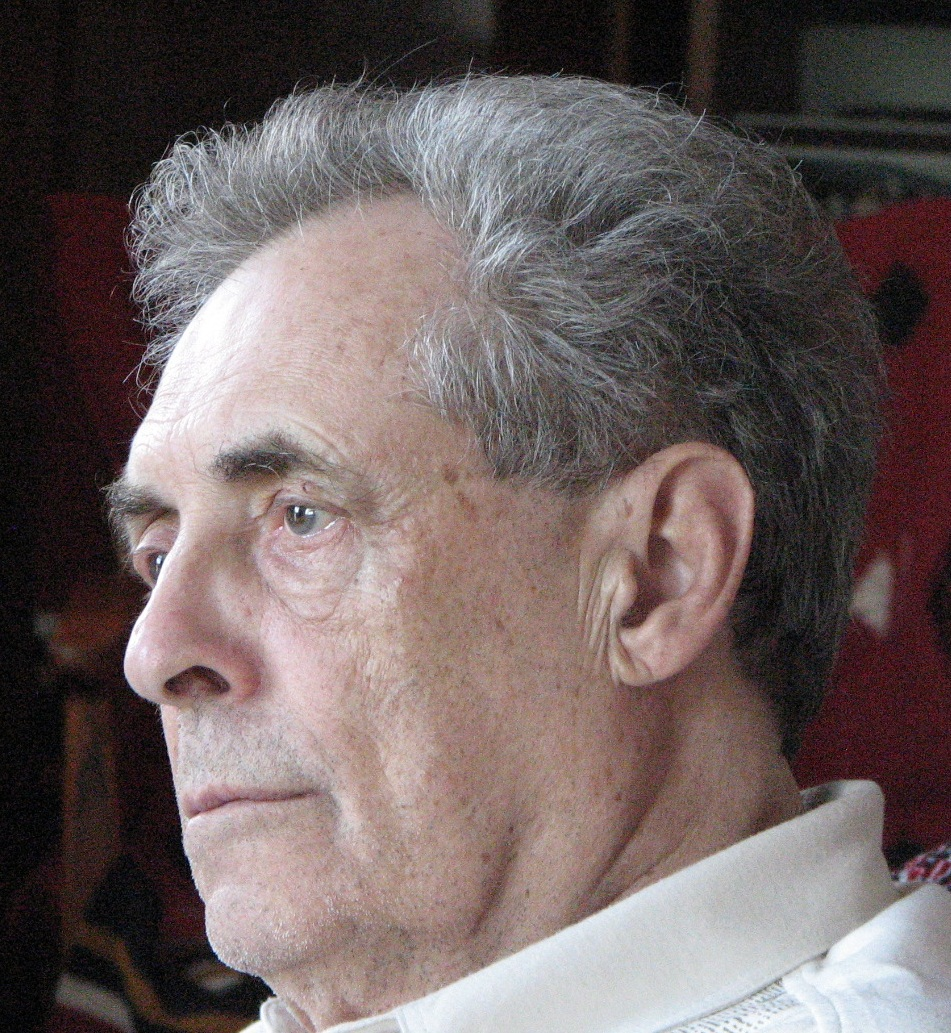
- Gitelson in 2008
- Born: Josef (Joseph or Iosif) Isaevich Gitelson; 6 July 1928; Samara, Russian SFSR, USSR
- Died: 25 September 2022 (aged 94); Moscow, Russia
- Citizenship: Soviet Union→Russian Federation
- Education: Moscow State University, Krasnoyarsk Medical Institute
- Known for: Man-made closed ecological systems, Bioluminescence, Biological life-support systems for space mission, Erythrogram - a method of clinical examination of the blood
- Awards: Lomonosov Medal (2018)
- Scientific career
- Fields: Biophysics,
- Workplaces: Institute of Biophysics, Siberian Branch of the Russian Academy of Sciences, Siberian Federal University
- Doctoral advisor: Leonid Kirensky

Josef (Joseph or Iosif) Isaevich Gitelson (Russian: Ио́сиф Иса́евич Гительзо́н; 6 July 1928 – 25 September 2022) was a Soviet and Russian biophysicist. PhD in biology (1955), DrSc in medicine (1961), Professor, Member of the Russian Academy of Sciences (1991); Corresponding member of the USSR Academy of Sciences (1979), Member of the USSR Academy of Sciences (1990). Director of Institute of Biophysics, Siberian Branch of the Russian Academy of Sciences (1984-1996). Academic Advisor at this Institute since 1996. Scientific supervisor of Institute of Fundamental Biology and Biotechnology Siberian Federal University. Member of International Academy of Astronautics. Honorary Citizen of Krasnoyarsk Krai since Sept 20, 2013 and the city of Krasnoyarsk. In 2018, JI Gitelson was awarded the highest award of the Russian Academy of Sciences, Lomonosov Gold Medal for the justification and development of the ecological direction of biophysics, which has achieved a number of outstanding fundamental and practical results, in particular, in marine and laboratory studies of bioluminescence.

== Biography ==
Born in Samara on 6 July 1928. His father, Isai Isaakovich Gitelson (1896-1965), was a dermatologist, Doctor of Medical Sciences (1940), Professor at the Krasnoyarsk State Medical Institute (1945-1965) (now, the Krasnoyarsk State Medical University named after Professor Voino-Yasnetsky). The Krasnoyarsk State Medical University since 1966 has been annually awarded the prize for the best scientific student work from the personal foundation bequeathed by Professor Isai Isaakovich Gitelson.

In 1951 Josef Gitelson graduated from the Faculty of Biology of the Lomonosov Moscow State University.

In 1952 he graduated from the medical faculty of the Krasnoyarsk Medical Institute.

From 1952 to 1953, he was a haematologist at the Krasnoyarsk Blood Transfusion Station.

From 1953 to 1957 - assistant, associate professor at the Krasnoyarsk Agricultural Institute.

From 1957 to 1961 - Senior Researcher at the Biophysics Laboratory of the Institute of Physics of the Siberian Branch of the USSR Academy of Sciences, Krasnoyarsk.

From 1961 to 1981 - Head of the Laboratory of Photobiology of the Institute of Physics named after L. V. Kirensky, Siberian Branch of the USSR Academy of Sciences.

From 1981 to 1991 - Head of the laboratory of photobiology, and in 1984-1996 - director of the Institute of Biophysics, Siberian Branch of the USSR/Russian Academy of Sciences.

From 1996 - Academic Advisor at the Institute of Biophysics, Siberian Branch of the Russian Academy of Sciences.

== Research achievements ==
1951 to 1970. In experimental hematology, JI Gitelson developed methods for the spectrophotometric analysis of red blood cell populations in normal and pathological conditions. He developed a general theory of the three-stage mechanism of hemolysis, described the patterns of distribution of red blood cell populations by stability, depending on their age, the intensity of production and destruction. He created mathematical models of erythropoiesis in normal conditions and in the case of blood loss.

1960 to 1985. Development of biophysical instruments and methods for instrumental research of large aquatic ecosystems. Design of a device for measuring the bioluminescence of marine ecosystems — a deep-sea bathyphotometer. Participation in a series of oceanographic expeditions in the Pacific, Atlantic, Indian and Arctic Oceans in the 1960s and 1980s, describing the main patterns of bioluminescence as a general oceanic phenomenon and its distribution in the World Ocean depending on the structure and productivity of marine ecosystems. The internationally renowned Russian bioluminescent research group was set up by Joseph Gitelson.

1961 to 1998. Development of biospherics-the section of ecology devoted to the study and creation of closed ecosystems. Development and creation of the complex "BIOS" - an experimental closed ecological system of human life support. Conducting long-term experiments in it. For the first time, the possibility of creating a stable, controlled, closed ecosystem for humans based on continuous cultivation of microorganisms and higher plants was experimentally demonstrated. The purpose of such systems is to support human life in space and in unfavourable conditions of the Earth: in the Arctic and Antarctic, under water, underground, in the high mountains, deserts, as well as in a polluted environment. According to the leaders of the project "Biosphere II", the most advanced work prior to their project "was conducted by Josef Gitelson and his team at the Bios-3 facility."

1995 to 1998. Development of the "Bioalarm" project aimed at monitoring the "health" of marine ecosystems and early warning of anomalies arising from anthropogenic and natural factors.

According to Encyclopedia of Krasnoyarsk Krai, J.I. Gitelson has initiated a number of scientific projects important for the future of humanity: "Ecology of Great Rivers of the World" (supported by UNESCO), "The Pristine Yenisey River " (supported by the Russian Academy of Sciences and Krasnoyarsk Territorial administration; "Chlorophyll in Biosphere").

Within the framework of "The Pristine Yenisey River" program, methods were developed for an objective assessment of the negative environmental consequences of hydroelectric power plants, the calculation of environmental compensation was justified, and options for constructive solutions were proposed that would help mitigate the harm caused.
