= Biodome =

Biodome may refer to:

- a closed ecological system
- Bio-Dome, a 1996 movie starring Pauly Shore and Stephen Baldwin and directed by Jason Bloom.
- the Montreal Biodome, a facility located in Montreal that allows visitors to walk through replicas of four ecosystems found in the Americas.
- the Montreal Biosphère, a geodesic dome on Ile Sainte-Hélène in Montreal, Quebec, Canada used as the pavilion for the 1967 World Exhibition Expo 67.
- Biosphere 2, an artificial closed ecosystem in Oracle, Arizona.
- BIOS-3, a closed ecosystem at the Institute of Biophysics in Krasnoyarsk, Siberia.
