= Yuegong-1 =

Chinese research facility for developing a Moon base

- Traditional Chinese: 月宮一號
- Simplified Chinese: 月宫一号
- Literal meaning: Lunar Palace Number One
Transcriptions
Standard Mandarin
- Hanyu Pinyin: Yuègōng Yīhào
- Yale Romanization: Ywè-Gūng Yī-Hàu

Yuegong 1 Hao
- Traditional Chinese: 月宮1號
- Simplified Chinese: 月宫1号
- Literal meaning: Lunar Palace 1
Transcriptions
Standard Mandarin
- Hanyu Pinyin: Yuègōng 1 Hào
- Yale Romanization: Ywè-Gūng 1 Hàu

Lunar Palace 1, Moon Palace 1 or Yuegong-1 (Chinese: 月宫1号 or 月宫1 or 月宫一号 or 月宫一; pinyin: Yuègōng 1 hào or Yuègōng 1 or Yuègōng Yī hào or Yuègōng Yī) is a Chinese research facility for developing a Moon base. It is an environmentally closed facility where occupants can simulate a long-duration self-contained mission with no outside inputs other than power/energy.

== Facilities ==
Lunar Palace 1 occupies a 160m^{2} 500m^{3} self-contained laboratory in Beijing composed of a 58m^{2} vegetation area of two cabins, a 42m^{2} living area with three bedrooms, dining room, bathroom and waste disposal chamber. The lab was designed by Liu Hong of the Beijing University of Aeronautics and Astronautics (BUAA). The lab is a type of bioregenerative life support system (BLSS), the third built in the world and the first in China.

With a crew of three, 55% of the food consumed is to be produced internally, balanced by reserves. The oxygen would be regenerated through the vegetation compartment, and the water is to be recycled internally. The crew's waste was composted.

Construction on the facility began in March 2013. The facility was unveiled on the Chinese New Year (31 January 2014). It was commissioned prior to the first mission starting in February 2014.

== Missions ==
=== 2014 - first research mission ===
The first research mission was the Permanent Astrobase Life-support Artificial Closed Ecosystem (PALACE) Research (aka "Lunar Palace-1"), a 105-day mission of three researchers. The one man, Dong Chen, and two women, Xie Beizhen and Wang Minjuan, volunteers from the BUAA, conducted the first long-duration research project of this kind in China, 3 February to 20 May 2014.

The crew grew five cereals, including wheat, corn, soybeans, peanuts and lentils; 15 vegetables, including carrots, cucumbers and water spinach; and one fruit, strawberries. The wheat provided the main source of calories and the primary source of oxygen. Meat was the primary foodstock; however, meat was grown, in the form of yellow mealworms, the crew's primary protein source.

The diet studied was to determine if a space crew could subsist on a high protein diet with vegetables and mealworms. The mealworms, composed of 3/4 protein, were chosen due to a United Nations study recommending them as a food source for the poor and undernourished; however, it was met with resistance from Western astronauts. They have a tendency to escape confinement. Mealworms reached the size of fingers in weeks. The mealworms were fed the leftover and inedible parts of the produce.

The mission's ecological system was to be a testbed for the controlled ecological life support system (CELSS) for China's Tiangong space station. The BLSS system used on the mission was at the time the most advanced ever fielded.

=== 2017-2018 - second research mission ===
The second mission, named "Lunar Palace 365", involved two teams of four volunteers who spent 370 days in isolation. The mission achieved total recycling of oxygen and water for human use, as well as complete production of plants and mealworms to sustain the volunteer's diet.

== See also ==
- BioHome – Technology on Space Stations & Closed Ecosystems
- BIOS-3 – Closed ecosystem at the Institute of Biophysics in Krasnoyarsk, Russia
- Biosphere 2 – Closed ecological research center in Arizona
- Biotron – Research greenhouse at University of Wisconsin
- Chinese Lunar Exploration Program – Lunar research program (2004–present)
