= Moon Palace (disambiguation) =

Moon Palace is a 1989 novel by Paul Auster.

Moon Palace, Lunar Palace, Palace of the Moon, or variant may also refer to:

- Candraprabha, the bodhisattva or deva of the Lunar Palace (or Moon Palace)
- The Moon Palace or Lunar Palace, a fictional location in Yun Mi-kyung's manhwa Bride of the Water God
- Moon Palace, a fictional location in Eiichi Ikegami's novel Shangri-La (シャングリ·ラ)

== See also ==
- Yuegong-1 (月宮一号), Lunar Palace 1 or Moon Palace 1, ecological life support system research facility in Beijing
