= Ecosphere (aquarium) =

Sealed blown-glass miniature aquaria

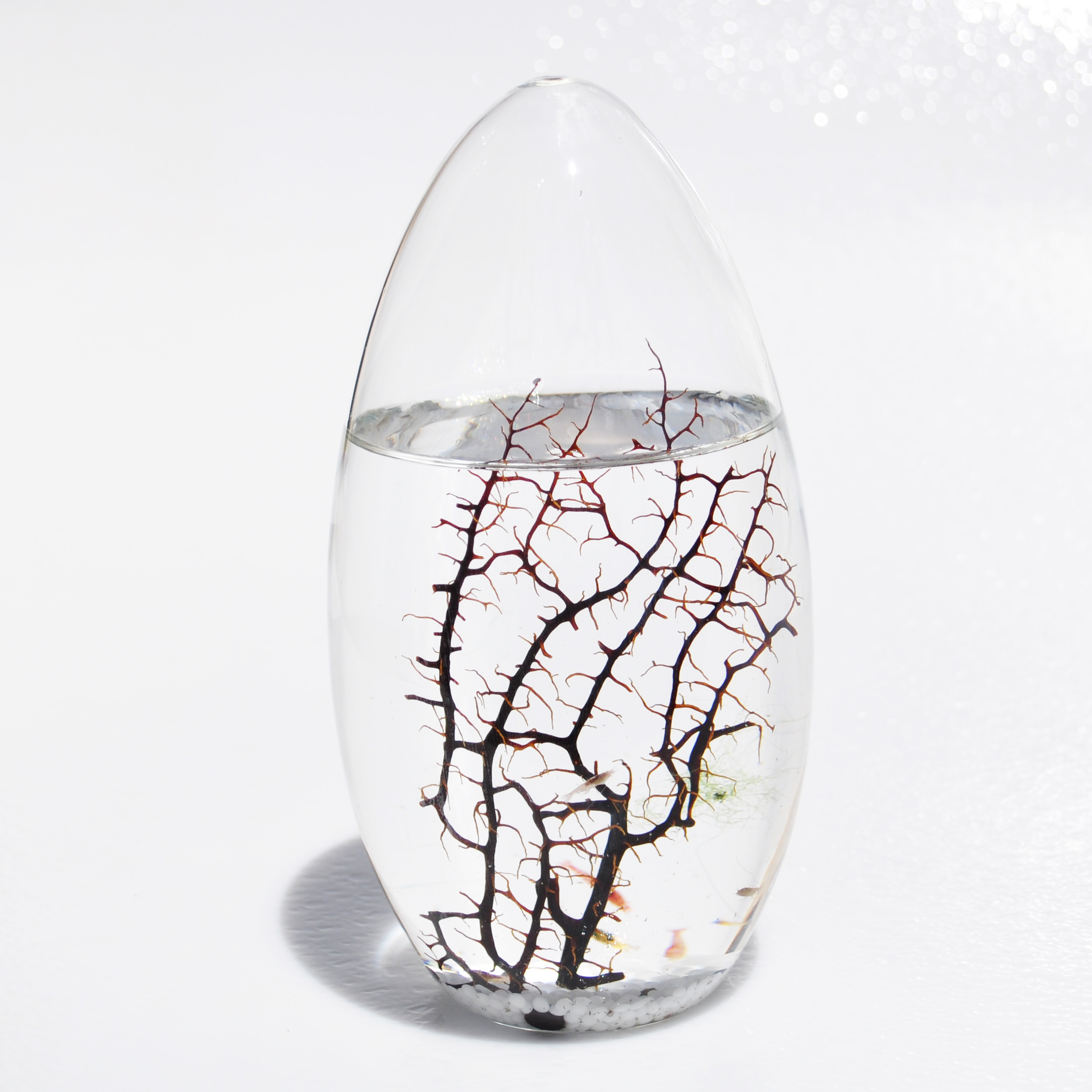
A pod Ecosphere.

The EcoSphere and "Original Ecosphere" are trademark names for sealed blown-glass miniature aquaria formerly produced by Ecosphere Associates, Inc., of Tucson, Arizona, United States. Spherical or ovoid, the aquaria ranged from roughly pool-ball-size to basket-ball-size. They were sold worldwide as scientific novelties and decorative objects.

The EcoSphere's main visual appeal was provided by tiny red-pink shrimp, Halocaridina rubra, between 1/4 and 3/8 inch (or approximately a centimeter) in length. The shrimp swam energetically around the aquarium; ate the brown bacterial and algal scum on the glass; consumed the filamentous green algae which formed a globular pillow in the water; and perched on a fragment of soft coral.

The main conceptual interest of these objects lay in the fact that they were materially closed ecological systems which were self-sustaining over a period of years. At room temperature, and with only low inputs of light, the algae produced oxygen which supported the shrimp and bacteria. Bacteria broke down the shrimps' wastes. The breakdown products provided nutrients to the algae and bacteria upon which the shrimp fed. The manufacturer stated that shrimp lived in the EcoSphere for an average of 2 to 3 years but were known to live over 12 years.

A small magnetic scrubber was enclosed in each EcoSphere. By passing another magnet over the outside of the glass, the owner could manipulate the scrubber to clean the inside of the EcoSphere.

Ecosphere Associates went out of business in early 2022. At that time, Ecosphere owners participating in online aquarium forums reported shrimp living over 15 years.

== History ==
Research on closed ecosystems was initiated by Vladimir Vernadsky's 1926 book The Biosphere and Konstantin Tsiolkovsky in the 1950s and 1960s in Russia, culminating in the manned closed BIOS-3 facility, a 315 cubic meter habitat located at the Institute of Biophysics, Krasnoyarsk, Siberia. Frieda Taub reviewed work from 1953 to 1974. Another pioneer was Clair Folsome of the University of Washington in the 1960s. On July 15, 1982, Joe Hanson of the NASA Jet Propulsion Laboratory (JPL) in Pasadena, California, held a workshop on "Closed Ecosystems". In 1983 Loren Acker, President of Engineering and Research Associates, Inc. obtained a NASA Spin-Off Technology license for the EcoSphere and with Daniel Harmony, in 1984 put the EcoSphere into full production.

== Biota ==
The manufacturer did not reveal the species of any of the components of the Ecosphere. However, Hawaiian aquarists readily recognized the filamentous alga as a Chaetomorpha species, the snails as common Malaysian trumpet snails (either Melanoides tuberculata or Tarebia granifera) and the shrimp as Halocaridina rubra. H. rubra is native to Hawaii, where it and other tiny shrimp inhabit anchialine pools. These are puddles or ponds located near shores and surrounded with lava rock. The pores and chambers of the lava allow seawater to seep into the pools, where it mixes with freshwater from springs or rain. Anchialine shrimp are noted for their great adaptability: they survive in pools of undiluted seawater and in brackish ponds; they tolerate water temperatures over 85 degrees Fahrenheit (near 30 degrees C) when the tropical sun heats up the shallowest anchialine pools, and they also thrive in cool water.

Prior to 2003, the EcoSpheres contained at least one Malaysian trumpet snail at the time of purchase. However, the system is self-sustaining without the snails. (The main function of the snails was aesthetic, as they cleaned scum from the glass.) The Gorgonia coral in EcoSpheres was dead and played no active biological role in the system; however it did increase the surface area for beneficial bacteria and algae, and the calcium carbonate in the coral acted as a pH buffering agent.

== Concerns ==
In 2010 the National Science Foundation reported that the shrimp’s sole habitat is shrinking, with over 90% of Hawaii’s anchialine pools having disappeared due to development, and this species of shrimp is disappearing along with them.

== Comparable objects and systems ==
Commercially packaged aquarium kits, including algae, intended to be left open or closed, are available in Hawaii. The customer can use these to create an aquarium comparable to the EcoSphere.

It is possible to purchase Halocaridina rubra shrimp from Hawaiian aquarium dealers and create home-made sealed aquaria with no other special supplies. Sand, gravel, crushed shell, and very well cycled filtered water from a successful saltwater aquarium, diluted with an equal volume of distilled or reverse-osmosis water, with the lowest attainable ammonia content, provides a suitable brackish water mixture. A small inoculation of live Spirulina algae may be introduced for food. Certain ubiquitous algae and bacteria are likely to be carried by the shrimp themselves and will soon colonize the walls of the container. There is a risk that pathogens also may be introduced.

Closed jar systems like the Ecosphere degrade with time. They are "self-sustaining" only in comparison to systems which degrade much more quickly.

The advantage of an aquarium closed with a lid (rather than a permanently sealed plug, which was found in the base of an EcoSphere) is that if the system goes out of equilibrium, the owner can remedy conditions and prevent a complete die-off. Intervention to maintain good water quality allows a larger number of shrimp to live in the open system than can survive in the relatively poor quality closed environment.

Freshwater closed systems are often attempted by hobbyists, and as experimental projects or demonstrations for biology classes. These require nothing more than a large glass jar with an airtight lid, a few cups of lake or river water, and mud or other substrate from the same body of water. Kept indoors at room temperatures, with exposure to sunlight from a window, such systems have been found to contain living organisms even after several decades. The original level of diversity always falls drastically, sometimes exhibiting interesting patterns of population flux and extinction. Multicellular organisms fare poorly. Eventually an equilibrium of micro-organisms is established.

Make magazine Volume 10 contained instructions for creating a self-contained fresh-water "biosphere", which contained a freshwater amano shrimp, snails, amphipods, ostracods, copepods, rigid hornwort, duckweed, pond scum (for microorganisms), and small rocks or shells (as a pH buffer).

In their paper "The Emergence of Materially-closed-system Ecology", Joe Hanson and Clair Folsome described the creation of Ecosphere-like closed ecosystems. Their containers were half-filled with 50% water brought to a salinity of 11 parts per thousand by the addition of "Instant Ocean", with the rest of the container filled with unmodified air. They used algae collected from the ponds of Halocaridina rubra shrimp, and 3 to 16 Halocaridina rubra shrimp (and their associated microbial populations). The container size was not stated. However, in similar, 2,000 ml setups the authors noted that while the survival rate of shrimp varies it averages 4 shrimp per 2,000 ml of container when not carbon, sulfur, or phosphorus limited; or 1 to 8 shrimp per 1,000 ml when limited. They also noted that the shrimp population in all ecosystems declined from the starting number to a steady state within 60 days.

== In the media ==
The ecosphere was reviewed by Carl Sagan in a 1986 Parade magazine article entitled "The World That Came in the Mail". The article is reprinted as a chapter in Sagan's last book, Billions and Billions.
