= Eggatron =

The Eggatron was a digital counter that recorded when an egg was laid in an effort to determine the most productive hens. The device was tested using battery cages at CSIRO's Poultry Research Centre at Werribee.

As each egg was laid, it would roll from the hen's cage and trigger a mercury switch, connected to a panel. The panel would relay a pulse to the Eggatron, prompting a converted P.M.G. teletyper to print and time-stamp on a roll of paper tape. The recorded data was duplicated on magnetic tape, and fed into a SILLIAC computer. The tape data assisted in identifying the birds with high egg production levels, who were then selected for breeding.

First mentioned in a 1962 Australian journal article, the development of the Eggatron was attributed to Dr. P.J. Claringbold of Sydney University's Veterinary Physiology Department, but the device was designed by Dr. Rathgeber of the Physics Department.

The Eggatron is but one of many tron-like developments of Cold War science that sought to control nature through technology, primarily through large centralized computer systems. The development of the phytotron, algatron, ecotron and zootron represents the explosion of these technologies through the 1950s and 1960s.
