= Krasnoyarsk State Medical University =

Education organization in Krasnoyarsk, Russia

Krasnoyarsk State Medical University named after Professor V. F. Voyno-Yasenetsky
- Russian: Красноярский государственный медицинский университет имени профессора В. Ф. Войно-Ясенецкого
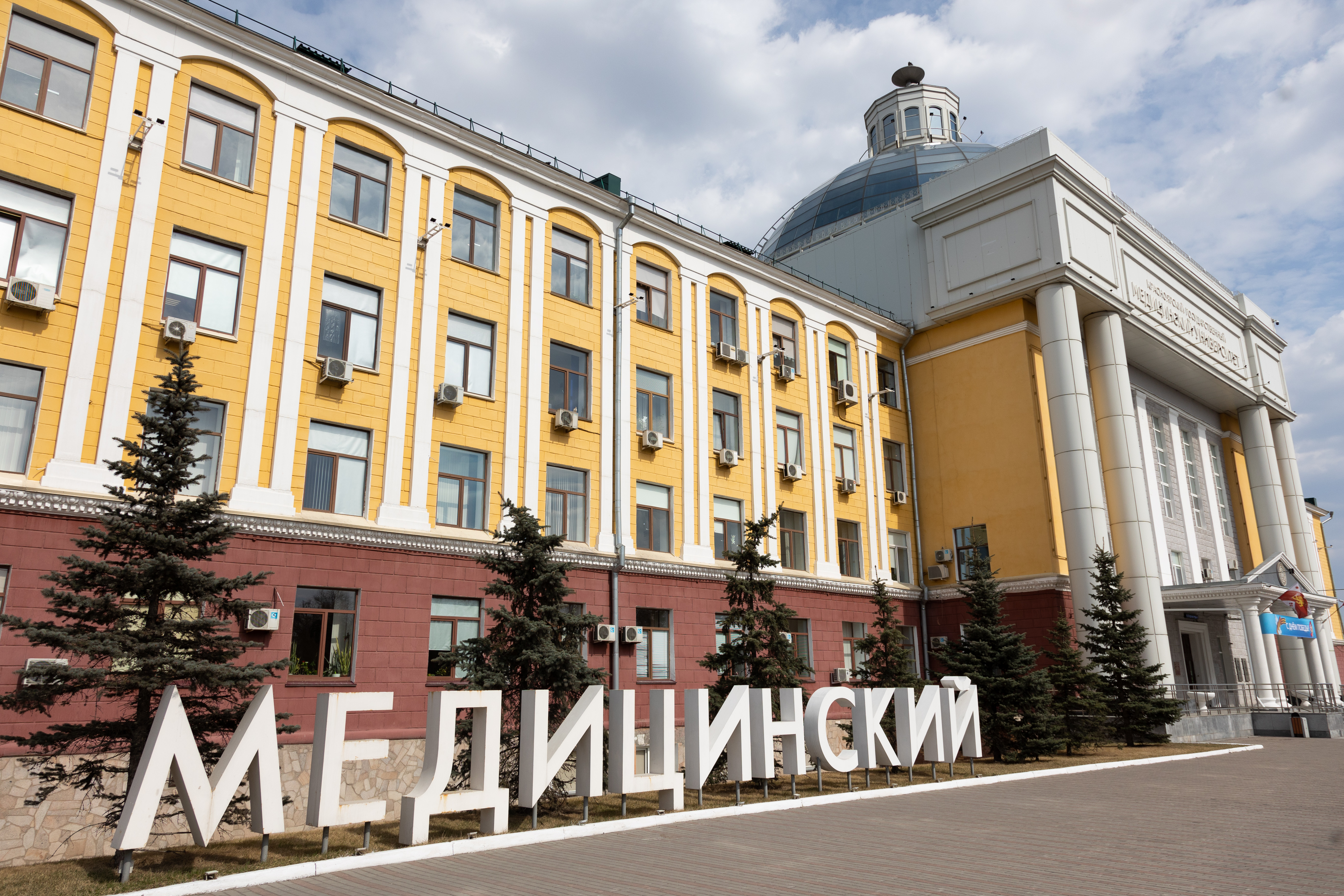
- Former names: Krasnoyarsk State Medical Academy
- Motto: «УЧИМ, ЛЕЧИМ, ИССЛЕДУЕМ!» "TEACH, CURE, RESEARCH!"
- Type: Government University
- Established: 1942
- Rector: Aleksei Vladimirovich Protopopov
- Academic staff: 1200
- Students: 9500 (Russian and foreign)
- Postgraduates: 1100
- Location: Krasnoyarsk, Russia; 56°01′29″N 92°54′25″E
- Campus: Urban
- Website: krasgmu.ru

Krasnoyarsk State Medical University named after Professor V. F. Voyno-Yasenetsky (KrasSMU) (KrasGMU) (Krasnoyarsk Medical Academy) (Russian: Красноярский государственный медицинский университет имени профессора В. Ф. Войно-Ясенецкого) is a public university located in the city of Krasnoyarsk, Russia, and founded in 1942.

== History ==
The Krasnoyarsk State Medical Institute (KSMI) was formed on November 21, 1942, by the decision of the All-Union Committee for Higher School Affairs under the Council of People's Commissars of the USSR and the People's Commissariat of Health of the USSR by merging the Voronezh Dental Institute evacuated to Krasnoyarsk, parts of the 1st Leningrad Medical Institute and the 2nd Leningrad Medical Institute, as well as the Leningrad Pediatric Institute and the Leningrad Dental Institute.

During the Great Patriotic War, the first students of the university were taught by surgeon, professor V.F. Voyno-Yasenetsky.

There were fifty-one doctors in the first graduation of KSMI students. In 1958, a pediatric faculty was added to the only training program - general medicine. In 1961, the Faculty of Pediatrics was opened, in 1978 - the Faculty of Dentistry. In 1992–2013, the Faculty of Higher Nursing Education operated at KSMI. In 1995, the institute was renamed the Krasnoyarsk State Medical Academy (KrasGMA). In 2006, the Faculty of Pharmacy was opened, in 2010 - the Faculty of Clinical Psychology, in 2011 - the Faculty of Medical Cybernetics. In 2007, the Medical Academy was named after Professor Valentin Feliksovich Voyno-Yasenetsky, and in 2008 - the status of a medical university.

== Description ==
Professor V.F. Voino-Yasenetsky Krasnoyarsk State Medical University is situated in the city of Krasnoyarsk, the administrative center of the Krasnoyarsk Region, the second largest region of the Russian Federation.

The university campus is situated in the center of the city. The educational programs are realized in the following specialties:

- General medicine (Russian Language)
- General medicine (English Language)
- Pediatrics
- Stomatology
- Pharmacy
- Medical cybernetics
- Clinical psychology

Classes of the Russian language for foreign students are organized at the university. Starting from 2019, the university launches educational programs for foreign students in English.

At the university there are 10 scientific-educational centers.

== University clinics and research ==
The university is engaged in joint scientific and educational programs with other universities and scientific centers of Moscow, Saint-Petersburg, Saratov, Tomsk, Novosibirsk, as well as with our partners from Japan, France, Italy, Germany and other countries.

- In campus clinics:

Internal medicine Cardiology Pulmonology Endocrinology Pediatrics Neurology Poly clinic Diagnostic center OG Surgery (general) Gastro Trauma Urology Psychiatrics Dermatology ICU Apart this university has more than 15 hospitals and polyclinics around Krasnoyarsk city.

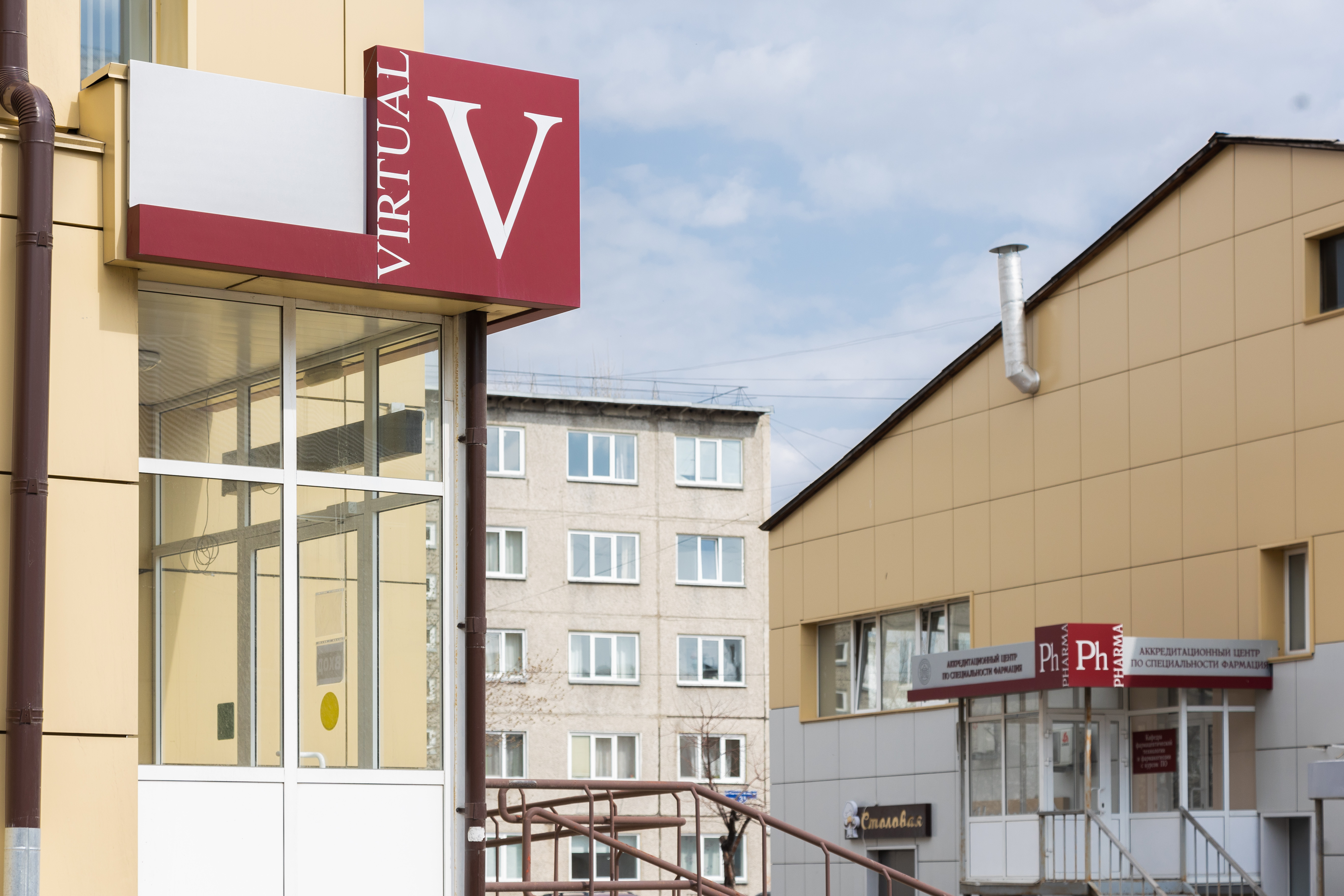

== Notable alumni ==
- Khassan Baiev, a Chechen surgeon who operated extensively during the Chechen Wars. By 2000, Baiev was the single surgeon for over 80,000 residents near Grozny, the capital of Chechnya, and at one point during the conflict he performed 67 amputations and eight brain operations in a 48-hour period. His patients included leading commanders Shamil Basayev and Salman Raduyev. He is known as the author of two memoirs titled “The Oath: A Surgeon Under Fire” and “Grief of My Heart: Memoirs of a Chechen Surgeon”.
- Iosif Gitelson, who was awarded the highest award of the Russian Academy of Sciences, Lomonosov Gold Medal for the justification and development of the ecological direction of biophysics.
- Anatoly Koryagin, who exposed political abuse of psychiatry in the Soviet Union. He pointed out Russia constructed psychiatric prisons to punish dissidents.

== Recognition ==
The university has gained recognition from the following international organizations:

- World Health Organization (WHO);
- Foundation for Advancement of International Medical Education and Research (FAIMER);
- Educational Commission for Foreign Medical Graduates (ECFMG);
- Nursing and Midwifery Council (NMC);
- General Medical Council (GMC);
- Sri Lanka Medical Council (SLMC) - awaiting for listing
