= Ice-sheet model =

Simulation of ice sheet change

In climate modelling, ice-sheet models use numerical methods to simulate the evolution, dynamics and thermodynamics of ice sheets, such as the Antarctic ice sheet, the Greenland ice sheet or the large ice sheets on the Northern Hemisphere during the Last Glacial Period. They are used for a variety of purposes, from studies of the glaciation of Earth over glacial–interglacial cycles in the past to projections of ice-sheet decay under future global warming conditions.

== History ==
Beginning in the mid-18th Century, investigation into ice sheet behavior began. Since the Journal of Glaciology's founding, physicists have been publishing glacial mechanics.

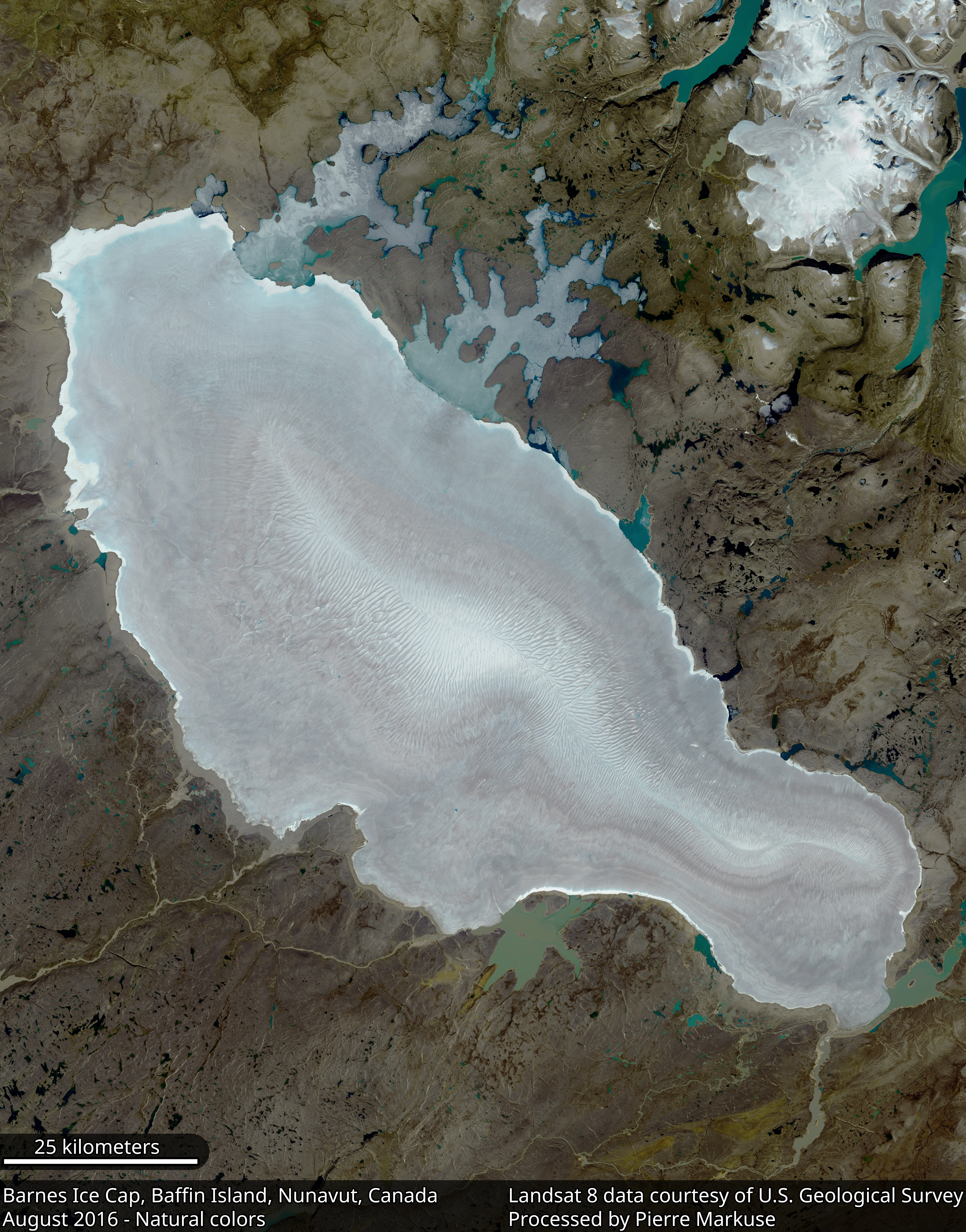
Barnes Ice Cap

The first 3-D model was applied to the Barnes Ice Cap. In 1988, the first thermodynamically coupled model incorporating ice-shelves, sheet/shelf transition, membrane stress gradients, isostatic bed adjustment and basal sliding using more advanced numerical techniques was developed and applied to the Antarctic ice sheet. This model had a resolution of 40 km and 10 vertical layers.

When the first IPCC assessment report came out in 1990, ice sheets were not an active part of the climate system model, their evolution was based on a correlation between global temperature and surface mass balance. When the second IPCC assessment report came out in 1996, the beginning of both 2D and 3D modelling was shown with ice sheets. The 1990s heralded several more computational models, bringing with it the European Ice Sheet Modelling Initiative (EISMINT). The EISMINT produced several workshops throughout the 1990s of an international collaboration, comparing most models of Greenland, Antarctic, ice-shelf, thermomechanical and grounding-line.

The 2000s included integrating first-order approximation of full Stokes Dynamics into an ice-sheet model. The fourth IPCC assessment report showed ice-sheet models with projections of rapid dynamical responses in the ice, which led to evidence of significant ice loss.

In 2016, part of the Coupled Model Intercomparison Project Phase 6 (CMIP Phase 6) was the Ice Sheet Model Intercomparison Project, which defined a protocol for all variables related to ice sheet modelling. The project allowed for both improvement in numerical and physical approaches to ice sheets.

== Modelling ==
=== Ice-Flow ===
==== Shallow Ice Approximation ====
Shallow Ice Approximation (SIA) is a simple method to model ice flow without having to solve full-Stokes equations. The approximation is best applied to ice sheet with a small depth-to-width ratio, without many sliding dynamics and a simple bed topography. SIA does not include many forces on an ice sheet, and can be considered a 'zero-order' model. The model assumes that ice sheets are mostly split up by basal sheer stress, and it is not necessary to consider the other forces. It also assumes that the basal shear stress and the gravitational driving stress of the grounded ice balance one another out. The method is computationally inexpensive.

==== Shallow Shelf Approximation ====
Shallow Shelf Approximation is another method to model ice flow, in particular a membrane-type flow of floating ice, or of sliding grounded ice over a base. Also known as a membrane model, they are similar to free-film models in fluid dynamics. As opposed to Shallow Ice Approximation, Shallow Shelf Approximation models ice flow when longitudinal forces are strong; sliding and vertical forces. SSA can also be considered a 'zero-order' model.

==== Full Stokes Equations ====
It is considered advantageous to model ice using Navier-Stokes equations as ice is a viscous fluid and these capture all forces exerted on the ice. As these equations are computationally expensive, it is important to include many approximations to reduce running time. Because of their computational expense, they are not easily used at a large scale and can be used in specific sections or scenarios, such as at grounding lines.

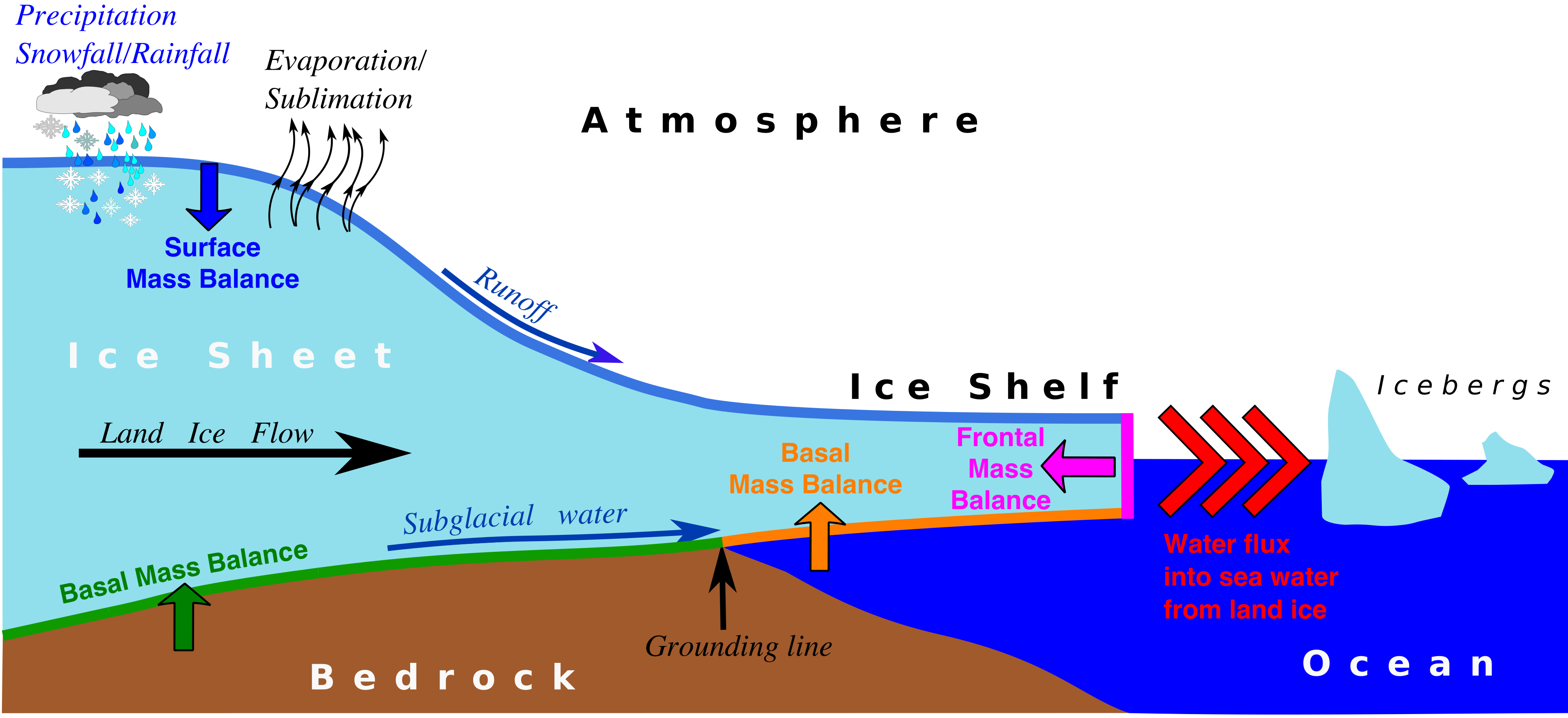
A diagram of some of the aspects of an ice-sheet model

=== Interactions with other climatic components ===
Ice sheets interact with the surrounding atmosphere, ocean and sub-glacial earth. All of these interactive components need to be included to be able to have a comprehensive ice-sheet model.

Basal Conditions play an important role in determining the behavior of ice sheets. The basal thermal state (if the ice is thawed or frozen) and the basal topography are difficult to map. The most favored method is to apply mass conservation constraints. For long-term projections, it is important to project the topography onto the continental shelf or into the fjords, and this can be difficult when the sub-glacial topography is not well-known.

Summer Insolation drive temperature responses that have an effect on the rate of melting and mass balance of the ice sheet. For example, the dependence of ice volume on summer insolation can be represented with ${d(I) \over d(t)} = {1 \over T} (S - I)$, where I is ice volume, ${d(I) \over d(t)}$ is the rate of change of ice volume per unit of time, T is the response time of the ice sheet and S is the insolation signal.

Air Temperature is needed in a model as it informs surface melt and runoff rates. For example, surface air temperature can be expressed with latitude 'lat', surface elevation h and mean temperature to provide an estimate of annual mean temperatures: $T_{aml} = temperature - c_1 * max(h, 1000) - c_2 * lat$. This example assumes the ice shelf 's surface is as cold as at 1000m altitude.

Precipitation is directly tied to air temperature, and also depends on moisture above and around the ice sheet. Precipitation plays an important part in ice-sheet melting and accumulation.

=== Calving ===
Calving is still an active area of investigation in ice-sheet modelling. A total picture of calving will include many different aspects, including but not limited to tides, basal crevasses, collisions with ice bergs, thickness and temperature. The recent development of the concepts of Marine Ice Sheet Instability and Marine Ice Cliff Instability have contributed to more accurate results of ice-sheet calving processes.

== Examples ==
=== CISM ===
The Community Ice Sheet Model is part of the Community Earth Systems Model funded by the National Science Foundation and models ice dynamics. It is written in Fortran 90 and is open-source. The US Department of Energy has begun to contribute to CISM. The CISM project works on other adjacent projects in developing a cirriculum to expand knowledge on ice sheets, and engaging a broader community in ice-sheet modelling. Many ice-sheet modelling softwares have influenced CISM, including the Parallel Ice Sheet Model (PSIM) and Glimmer.

=== seaRISE ===
Sea-level Response to Ice Sheet Evolution (SeaRISE) is a subcommunity of CISM that sets out to estimate the upper limit of sea level rise from ice sheets. The project sets out to develop a set of experiments and assessments for ice sheet and sea level rise modelling, as well as make a unified input dataset for ice sheet models.

=== Glimmer ===
Glimmer (GENIE Land Ice Model with Multiply-Enabled Regions) is an ice-sheet model initially made to contribute to a more comprehensive earth system model, GENIE.

=== PISM ===
The Parallel Ice Sheet Model is an open-sourced 3D ice sheet model capable of high resolution. PISM is written in C++ and Python, and takes NetCDF files as input for the model. PISM uses a "SIA+SSA hybrid" model, using both the shallow shelf approximation and shallow ice approximation models as stress balance models and does not solve full Stokes equations. The model gets climatic information from an external General Circulation Model, and needs information like boundary temperature, mass flux into the ice, precipitation and air temperature.

A horizontal grid of equal distance is used, with a variable vertical axis, and runs on a year timescale.

== See also ==
- Biosphere model
- Ice-sheet dynamics
- Sea level rise

== Ice-sheet models on the web ==
- CISM – Community Ice Sheet Model, under development as a land-ice component of the Community Earth System Model (CESM)
- Elmer/Ice – a multi-physics finite element code with special modules for full-stress ice dynamics analysis
- ISSM – Ice-Sheet and Sea-level System Model, a large-scale thermo-mechanical 2D/3D parallelized multi-purpose finite-element software dedicated to ice sheet and sea-level modeling.
- PISM – Parallel Ice Sheet Model, which includes ice shelves and ice streams
- SICOPOLIS – SImulation COde for POLythermal Ice Sheets, a 3D ice-sheet model which accounts for polythermal conditions (coexistence of ice at and below the melting point in different parts of an ice sheet)
