= Biotron =

Biotron may refer to:

- Biotron, a controlled ecological life-support system used for studying a living organism's response to specific environmental conditions or to produce uniform organisms for use in experiments
- Space Environment Simulation Laboratory
- Biotron (Wisconsin), at the University of Wisconsin-Madison
- Biotron (Western University) at the University of Western Ontario run by Norman Hüner and Brian Branfireun
- Phytotron at the California Institute of Technology
- The biotron at the Russian Academy of Sciences Shemyakin and Ovchinnikov Institute of Bioorganic Chemistry
- The biotron at the University of Alberta
- Biotron Limited, an Austrian biotech company and creator of BIT225
- The robot co-pilot in Micronauts (comics)
- A negative resistance vacuum tube invented by John Scott-Taggart
