= Leonid Kirensky =

Soviet physicist (1909–1969)

Leonid Vasilyevich Kirensky (Russian: Леонид Васильевич Киренский; April 7, 1909 in Amga, Russian Empire – November 3, 1969 in Moscow, Soviet Union), whose name was also written as Leonid Vasil'evich Kirenskii, was a Soviet physicist and university professor.

== Life and career ==
Kirensky came from a family of farmers. In 1915 his father died and he was enrolled in the Amga parish school. In 1919, after graduating from elementary school, the family moved to Yakutsk. When Kirensky graduated from secondary school in Yakutsk in 1927 and failed the entrance examination at the Moscow Mining Institute, he began the difficult work of teaching physics and mathematics at the Russian Model Experimental School in Yakutsk. In 1928 he became a teacher at the middle school in Olyokminsk and in 1930 a teacher in Yakutsk.

1931-1937 Kirensky studied at the Physics Faculty of Moscow State University (MSU). He was a student of Nikolay Sergeyevich Akulov and in 1937 published his first scientific work on the temperature dependence of the magnetization curve. The aspirant followed. In 1939 he defended his candidate dissertation at the MSU on the magnetocaloric effect in the rotation of a ferromagnetic crystal in a magnetic field.

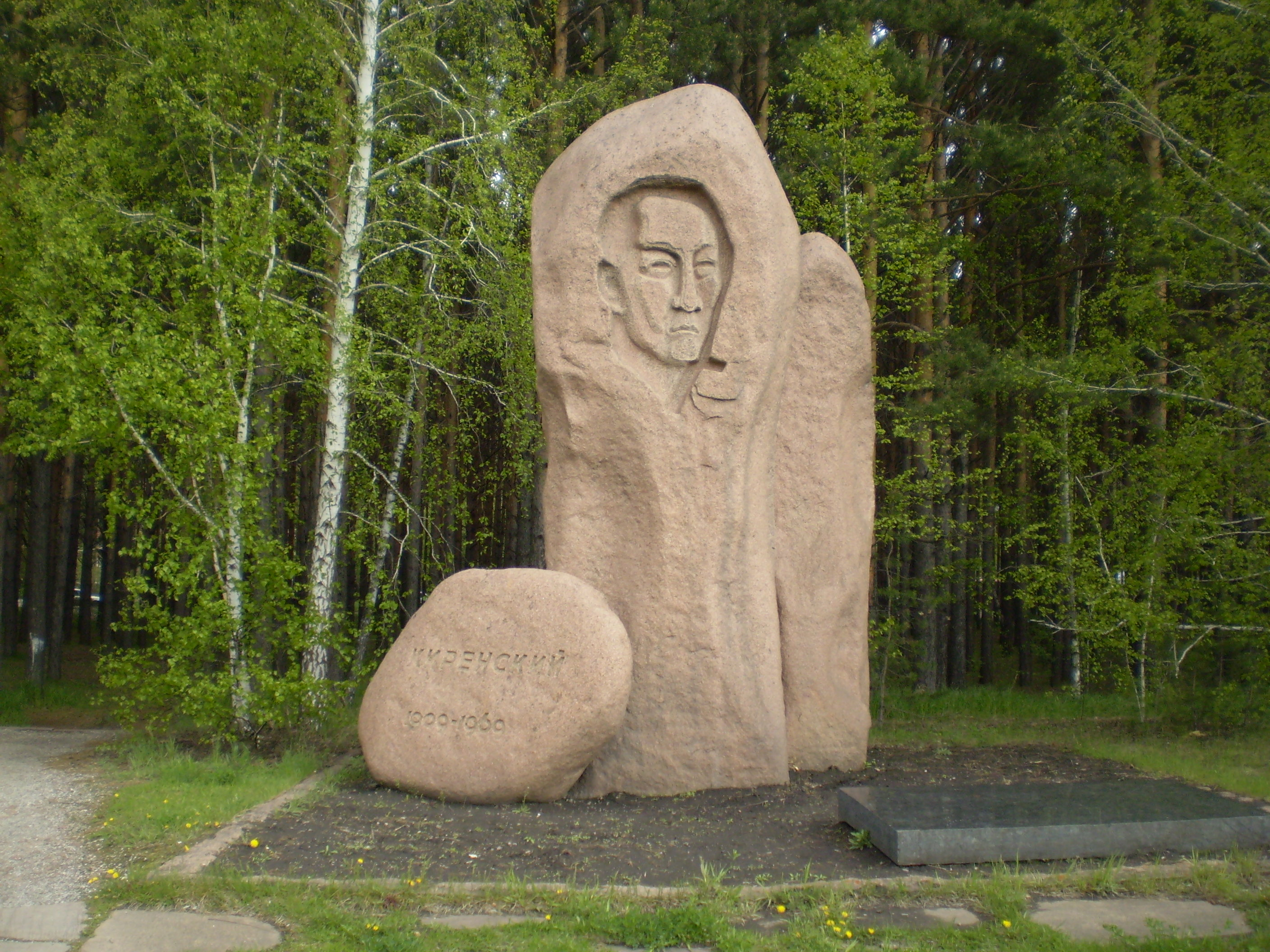
A memorial for Kirensky

In 1940, Kirensky was sent to the Pedagogical Institute in Krasnoyarsk to work as a lecturer. In 1941 he took over the management of the Chair of Physics. In 1943 he organized the Magnet Laboratory of the Pedagogical Institute. In the same year he entered the CPSU. 1949-1969 he was chairman of the Krasnoyarsk regional committee for the defense of peace. In 1950 he defended his doctoral dissertation on the energy state of ferromagnets.

In 1956 Kirensky organized the Institute of Physics of the Siberian Branch of the Academy of Sciences of the Soviet Union (AN-SSSR, since 1991 Russian Academy of Sciences (RAN)) in Krasnoyarsk, which he had founded after a long effort, and was its director until 1969, when his student Ivan Terskov became his successor. Josef Gitelson was also one of his students. In July 1960, Kirensky conducted the First All-Union Symposium on Magnetic Thin Films in Krasnoyarsk.

From 1960 to 1969, Kirensky was a deputy in the Supreme Soviet of the Soviet Union and a member of the Commission on Foreign Affairs. In 1964 Kirensky was elected a corresponding member of the AN-SSSR. In 1966, he took part on the XXIII. Party Congress of the CPSU. That same year he conducted the first All Union Symposium on Strong Magnetic Fields. In 1968 he was elected a full member of the Academy of Sciences of the Soviet Union. In the same year he conducted the first international symposium on the physics of magnetic thin films in Irkutsk. In October 1969 he attended the Congress of the International Astronautical Federation in Argentina. On the return journey he died in Moscow of a heart attack.

Kirensky was buried in the Krasnoyarsk Akademgorodok. His funerary monument, crafted by N. A. Silis, Vladimir Sergeyevich Lemport and L. A. Sokolov, was erected in 1974. The Institute of Physics received Kirensky's name, and a memorial museum was established at the institute. Streets in Krasnoyarsk and Amga, as well as the Lyceum Amga bear Kirensky's names.

== Awards ==
Kirensky received the following awards:

- Order of the Red Banner of Labour (1961)
- Hero of Socialist Labour (1969)
- Order of Lenin (1969)
