= William J. Oswald =

- Born: July 6, 1919; King City, California
- Died: December 8, 2005 (aged 86); Concord, California
- Education: University of California, Berkeley
- Scientific career
- Fields: Wastewater treatment, aquaculture, public health, phycology
- Workplaces: University of California, Berkeley; Lawrence Berkeley National Laboratory

William Joseph Oswald (July 6, 1919 – December 8, 2005) was an American educator, scientist, and engineer who spent his entire academic career at the University of California, Berkeley in the departments of Civil and Environmental Engineering and Public Health. He made foundational contributions to the fields of wastewater treatment and applied phycology, or as he called it, "algology". Throughout a career spanning more than five decades, Oswald was the primary academic advisor to more than two dozen doctoral students, sat on more than 100 additional masters and doctoral thesis committees, and taught seminal courses in applied algology.

== Early life, military service, and education ==
Oswald was born in King City, California in 1919. He grew up on a ranch, where the arid climate stoked his interest in water supplies, wastewater treatment, and water use. In World War II, he served in the Army Air Forces and was responsible for water safety at one of the D-Day invasion camps. Oswald remained in the Army in Europe after the war, working in a hospital where he cared for patients suffering from waterborne ailments and met his lifelong wife, an American nurse. Returning home to California, he obtained a degree in civil engineering from the University of California, Berkeley in 1950 on the G.I. Bill. He then continued his studies and was awarded an M.S. (1951) and Ph.D. (1957) in sanitary engineering, biology and public health. Oswald joined the faculty of the university the same year and went on to become a full professor in 1970. He remained in the position his entire career, staying on as an emeritus professor after his retirement.

== Career ==
Oswald studied the role of algae in wastewater treatment as a student, winning recognition from the American Society of Civil Engineers for his early work. He continued investigating the use of microalgae in sanitation throughout his career, developing strategies for combining engineered algae ponds to obtain specific water treatment goals. He developed the "high rate pond system" of shallow, mixed raceway ponds to maximize algae productivity. This design is still in use today, responsible for over 90% of the world's commercial microalgae production. His work led to the development of the "Advanced Integrated Wastewater Pond System", in which wastewater flows through a series of ponds, starting with deeper "facultative" ponds, then high rate ponds, and finally maturation ponds. The research undertaken by Oswald and his students and collaborators provided the foundations for much of modern microalgae wastewater treatment technology. Wastewater treatment plants based on his designs operate throughout the world today.

With broader implications in energy and nutrient cycles, Oswald’s work often crossed over into related fields such as waste energy recovery, biofuels, animal feeds, and waste nutrient reuse. The Air Force’s interest in waste and nutrient recycling for long term space missions led to Oswald’s development of the Algatron–a device that would grow microalgae on astronaut waste, treating water and also producing oxygen and food.

An archive of Oswald's work is maintained by former student and long time collaborator Tryg Lundquist, now a professor of Environmental Engineering at Cal Poly, San Luis Obispo.

== Awards and honors ==
Oswald was recognized throughout his career. He received the Harrison Prescott Eddy Medal in 1953 from the Water Pollution Control Federation (now known as the Water Environment Federation) for describing photosynthetic oxygenation. The American Society of Civil Engineers awarded him both the Rudolf Hering Medal and the James Croes Medal in 1957 for work describing the fixation of nutrients and capture of solar energy by microalgae and the Arthur M. Wellington Award in 1966 for various investigations of life support systems for extended space travel. In 2005 he was awarded the lifetime achievement prize of the International Society for Applied Phycology and in 2006 he was nominated for the Stockholm Water Prize.
