= Assimitron =

Japanese electronic device used in commercial agriculture

The Assimitron was a Japanese device used to measure fluctuating CO_{2} levels at crop canopies. Led by E. Inoue at the National Institute of Agricultural Sciences in Tsukuba, Japan, the device itself was an offshoot of an earlier Australian invention, the Evapotron that first found mention in a 1958 article in the journal Nature. The Evaporimeter, as it was first called, was used to measure the evaporation from natural surfaces. As for the Assimitron, it “instantaneously” performed “the necessary calculations for determining water vapour flux by correlation of humidity fluctuations with vertical wind fluctuations.”. Such calculations required the use of a complex centralized computer to process the enormous quantities of data. Part of this stemmed from the need to perform two different equations to deal with turbulent and low flows, depending on whether it was a windy or sunny day.

== See also ==
- Phytotron
