= Biosphere model =

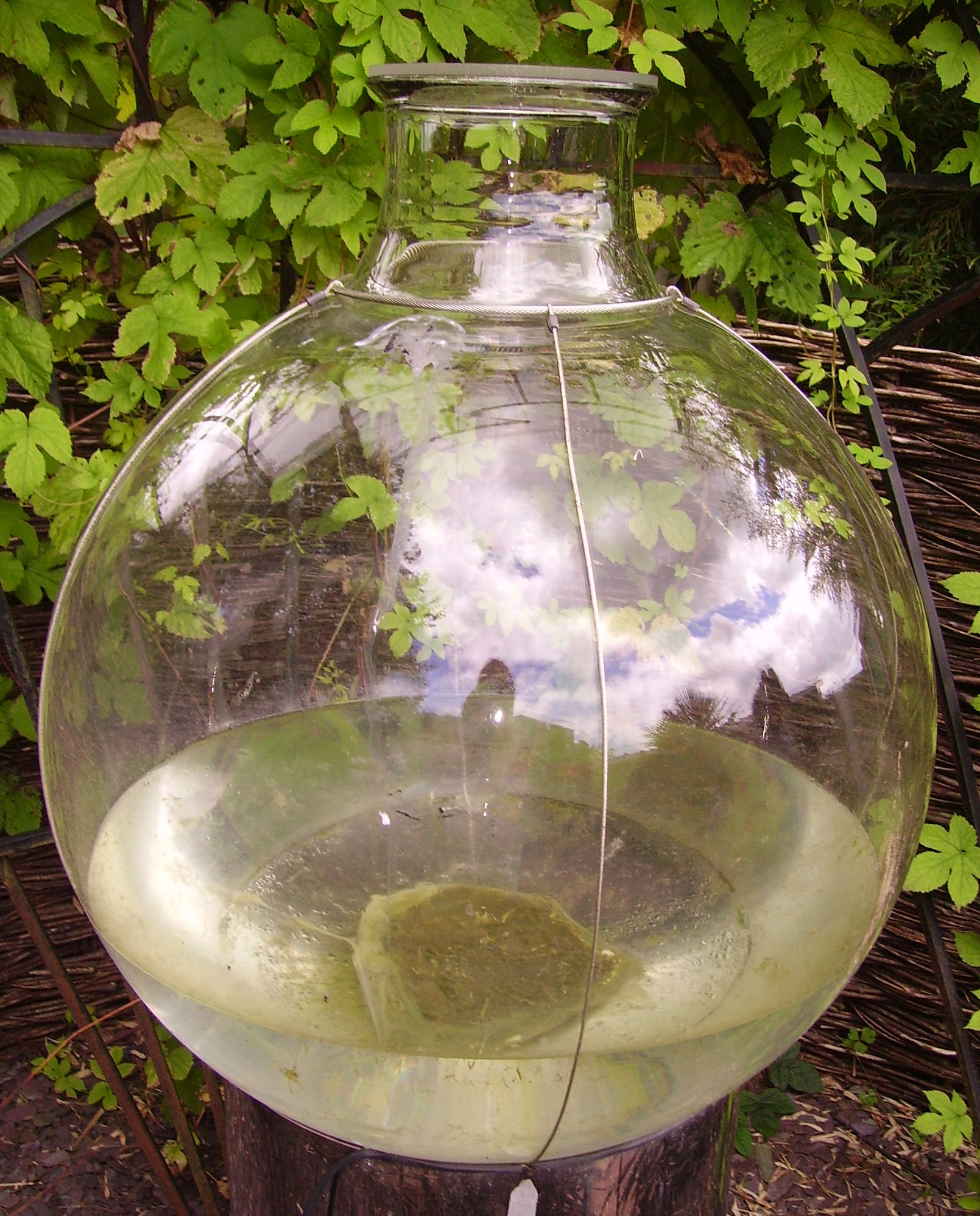
Biosphere

In climate science, a biosphere model, is used to model the biosphere of Earth, and can be coupled with atmospheric general circulation models (GCMs) for modelling the entire climate system. It has been suggested that terrestrial biosphere models (TBMs) are a more inclusive term than land surface models (LSMs). The representation of roots in TBMs (or LSMs), however, remains relatively crude. Particularly, the dynamic functions of roots and phylogenetic basis of water uptake remain largely absent in TBMs (or LSMs).

== Models ==
The Daisyworld computer simulation from 1983, calculated how radiant energy increased or decreased, dependent on the albedo effect, based on changes in the biosphere.

The Simple Biosphere (SiB) model, presented by Sellers et al. in 1986, calculates transfer of energy, mass and momentum of the atmosphere and the vegetated surface of the Earth. The model is designed for use in atmospheric general circulation models, to account for the related climate attribution of the biosphere. A revised version was published in 1996 and incorporates satellite measurements.

The Ent Dynamic Terrestrial Biosphere Model is a global vegetation model for use with the Earth System Modeling Framework.

== See also ==
- Earth's energy budget
- Ice-sheet model
- Land surface models
