= Biotron (Wisconsin) =

Research greenhouse at University of Wisconsin

The Biotron is a research facility located at the University of Wisconsin-Madison that "provides controlled environments and climate-controlled greenhouses to support plant, animal, and materials research for university, non-profit, and commercial clients."

== History ==
An evolution of the phytotron, the development of the facility had its roots in the late 1950s as a campaign established by the Botanical Society of America in search of a national phytotron. With additional funding and support by the National Science Foundation the Biotron was eventually envisioned as a combination facility that would allow both plant and animal tests to be conducted.

Plant physiologist Folke Skoog would be instrumental in bringing the Biotron to the University of Wisconsin-Madison. A colleague of Frits Went at Caltech, Skoog oversaw the two proposals the university submitted to the Botanical Society in 1959. The interdisciplinary nature and scope of the project quickly led it to becoming Madison's most expensive facility at around $4.2 million. It was up to Harold Senn, appointed director of the Biotron to concentrate on assembling funding, which he was able to accomplish by January 1963, with the Ford Foundation and National Institute of Health contributing to the project.

The Biotron was officially dedicated on September 18, 1970 with many experiments under precise controlled environmental conditions already under study, such as a lizard in the Palm Springs desert or black-eyed peas growing in hot and humid Nigeria. When finally completed in 1971, the Biotron contained over fifty rooms with many able to variate temperature from as low as −25 °C to as high as 50 °C with humidity adjustable anywhere from 1%–100%. Data from the various tests and sensors would then be fed and logged into a PDP-8/E-AA computer. Senn supposedly spent an additional $3,000 of the Biotron budget on increasing the computer's memory an extra 4 kilobytes.

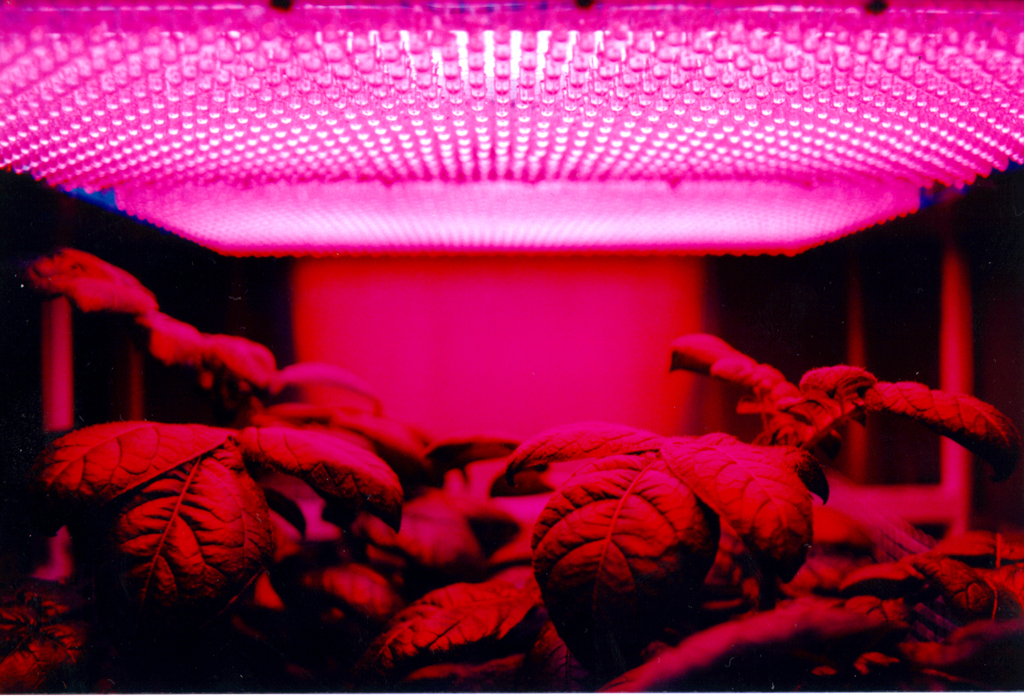
LED panel light experiment on potato plant growth by NASA.

In 1977, the International Crane Foundation brought endangered Siberian crane eggs from the U.S.S.R. to the Biotron for incubation and initial feeding. A hyperbaric chamber was added and used for experiments on the effects of diving on pregnancy. A hypobaric chamber was used for high altitude tests of devices administering doses of vaccines and drugs.

Although the Biotron went through a period of decline in the 1980s, unlike other facilities it never closed. In 1986, the first experiments using LEDs to grow plants were developed with NASA and tests were performed for the Galileo probe before its 1989 launch. Much of its work in the 1990s partnered with NASA in the Controlled Ecological Life Support System (CELSS) and its goal in researching the viability of certain vegetables for space travel, in particular the potato. Study of animal hibernation were done by ESA for human space exploration.

== Rooms ==
The Biotron has 45 rooms that are capable of simulating a range of environmental variables with precision and control. These rooms feature separate air handling and control over the temperature, humidity, and lighting. Some rooms specialize in isolation from sound and vibration, electromagnetic radiation, or pressure.

== See also ==
- Phytotron
