= BIOS-3 =

Closed ecosystem at the Institute of Biophysics in Krasnoyarsk, Russia

General information
- Type: Research facility
- Location: Institute of Biophysics in Krasnoyarsk, Russia
- Completed: 1972
- Owner: Institute of Biophysics, Siberian Branch of the Russian Academy of Sciences

Technical details
- Floor area: 14x9 m

Website
- www.ibp.ru/science/bios3.php

BIOS-3 is an experimental closed ecosystem at the Institute of Biophysics in Krasnoyarsk, Russia.

Its construction began in 1965, and was completed in 1972. BIOS-3 consists of a 315 cubic metres (11,100 cu ft) underground steel structure suitable for up to three persons, and was initially used for developing closed ecological human life-support ecosystems. It was divided into 4 compartments, one of which is a crew area. The crew area consists of 3 single-cabins, a galley, lavatory and control room. Initially one other compartment was an algal cultivator, and the other two phytotrons for growing wheat or vegetables. The plants growing in the two phytotrons contributed approximately 25% of the air filtering in the compound. Later, the algal cultivator was converted into a third phytotron. A level of light comparable to sunlight was supplied in each of the 4 compartments by 20 kW xenon lamps, cooled by water jackets. The facility used 400 kW of electricity, supplied by a nearby hydroelectric power station.

Chlorella algae were used to recycle air breathed by humans, absorbing carbon dioxide and replenishing it with oxygen through photosynthesis. The algae were cultivated in stacked tanks under artificial light. To achieve a balance of oxygen and carbon dioxide, one human needed 8 square metres (86 sq ft) of exposed Chlorella. Air was purified of more complex organic compounds by heating to 600 °C (1,112 °F) in the presence of a catalyst. Water and nutrients were stored in advance and were also recycled. By 1968, system efficiency had reached 85% by recycling water. Dried meat was imported into the facility, and urine and feces were generally dried and stored, rather than being recycled.

BIOS-3 facilities were used to conduct 10 crewed closure experiments with a one to three person crew. The longest experiment with a three-person crew lasted 180 days (in 1972-1973). The facilities were used for the tests at least until 1984.

In 1986, Dr. Josef Gitelson, head of the Institute of Biophysics (IBP) at Krasnoyarsk and developer of biospherics as well the BIOS project, met with Oleg Gazenko, Mark Nelson, John Allen and others involved with Biosphere 2, which led to further cooperation. In 1989, a group from Biosphere 2 visited the BIOS-3 facilities. Mark Nelson and John Allen have acknowledged the importance of BIOS-3 and Russian insights to Biosphere 2.

In 1991, BIOS-3 became a part of the International Center for Closed Ecosystems, which was formed as a subdivision of Institute of Biophysics, Russian Academy of Sciences, Siberian Branch. Closed ecosystems research focusing on growing plants and recycling waste was resumed in 2005 in cooperation with European Space Agency.

== See also ==
- Biosphere reserve
- Simple Biosphere model
- Revised Simple Biosphere Model (SIB-2)
- Habitable zone
- Life support system
- Wardian case
- Winogradsky column
- Homeostasis
- Montreal Biosphère
- MELiSSA
