= Closed ecological system =

Ecosystem that does not exchange matter with the exterior

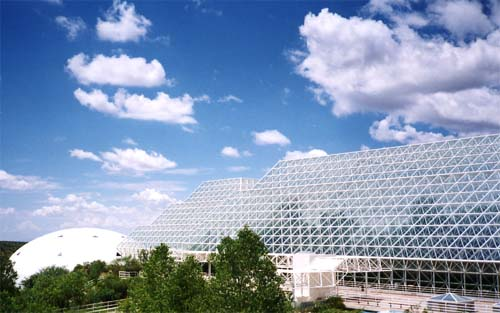
Biosphere 2

Closed ecological systems or contained ecological systems (CES) are ecosystems that do not rely on matter exchange with any part outside the system in order to help maintain life.

The term is most often used to describe small, man-made ecosystems. Such systems can potentially serve as a life-support system or space habitats.

In a closed ecological system, any waste products produced by one species must be used by at least one other species. If the purpose is to maintain a life form, such as a mouse or a human, waste products such as carbon dioxide, feces, and urine must eventually be converted into oxygen, food, and water.

These systems still rely on constant external energy input, such as sunlight.

A closed ecological system must contain at least one autotrophic organism. While both chemotrophic and phototrophic organisms are plausible, almost all closed ecological systems to date are based on an autotroph such as green algae.

== Examples ==
A closed ecological system for an entire planet is called an ecosphere.

Man-made closed ecological systems which were created to sustain human life include Biosphere 2, MELiSSA, and the BIOS-1, BIOS-2, and BIOS-3 projects. However, no artificial closed ecological systems involving humans have been able to successfully support life for long periods of time.

Bottle gardens and aquarium ecospheres are partially or fully enclosed glass containers that are self-sustaining closed ecosystems that can be made or purchased. They can include tiny shrimp, algae, gravel, decorative shells, and Gorgonia.

== Weaknesses ==
Closed ecological systems often remain unstable due to low biodiversity, as they contain far less species than natural ecosystems. They also lack the redundancy that help stabilize natural cycles, trophic interactions, and population dynamics, as any decline in the species of the closed system may lead to system collapse as no other organisms are able to compensate.

Natural processes such as carbon sequestration and oxygen production are highly sensitive to changes within a closed system, which can lead to dangerous accumulations or depletions in gases and toxins. For example, in Biosphere 2, oxygen levels declined while soil microbes produced higher levels of carbon dioxide, which resulted in higher rates of algal blooms in water bodies. As a result, 30% of the species and all pollinators died off.

Human involvement in closed systems create further weaknesses, as human respiration and nutritional diet are placed under additional strain. Micronutrient limitations, psychological needs, and waste production complicates the long-term overall stability of the system.

== In fiction ==
Closed ecological systems are commonly featured in fiction and particularly in science fiction. These include domed cities, space stations and habitats on foreign planets or asteroids, cylindrical habitats (e.g. O'Neill cylinders), Dyson Spheres and so on.

== See also ==
- Biosphere – Global sum of all ecosystems on Earth
- Controlled ecological life-support system – Technology on Space Stations & Closed Ecosystems
- Controlled-environment agriculture – Technology-based approach toward food growing
- IBTS Greenhouse – Egyptian desalination project
- Ecology – Study of organisms and their environment
- Ecosphere – Planetary closed ecological system
- Ecosystem services – Benefits provided by intact ecosystems
- Eden Project – Visitor attraction in Cornwall, United Kingdom
- MELiSSA – European Space Agency led consortium developing life support systems for space missions
- Space colonization – Concept of permanent human habitation outside of Earth
- Spome – Hypothetical matter-closed, energy-open life support system
- Terraforming – Hypothetical planetary engineering process
- Chang'e 4 – 2019 Chinese lunar lander & rover
- Space stations and habitats in fiction
