= Phytotron =

Enclosed research greenhouse

Phytotron at Estonian University of Life Sciences

A phytotron is an enclosed research greenhouse used for studying interactions between plants and the environment. It was a product of the disciplines of plant physiology and botany.

== Overview ==
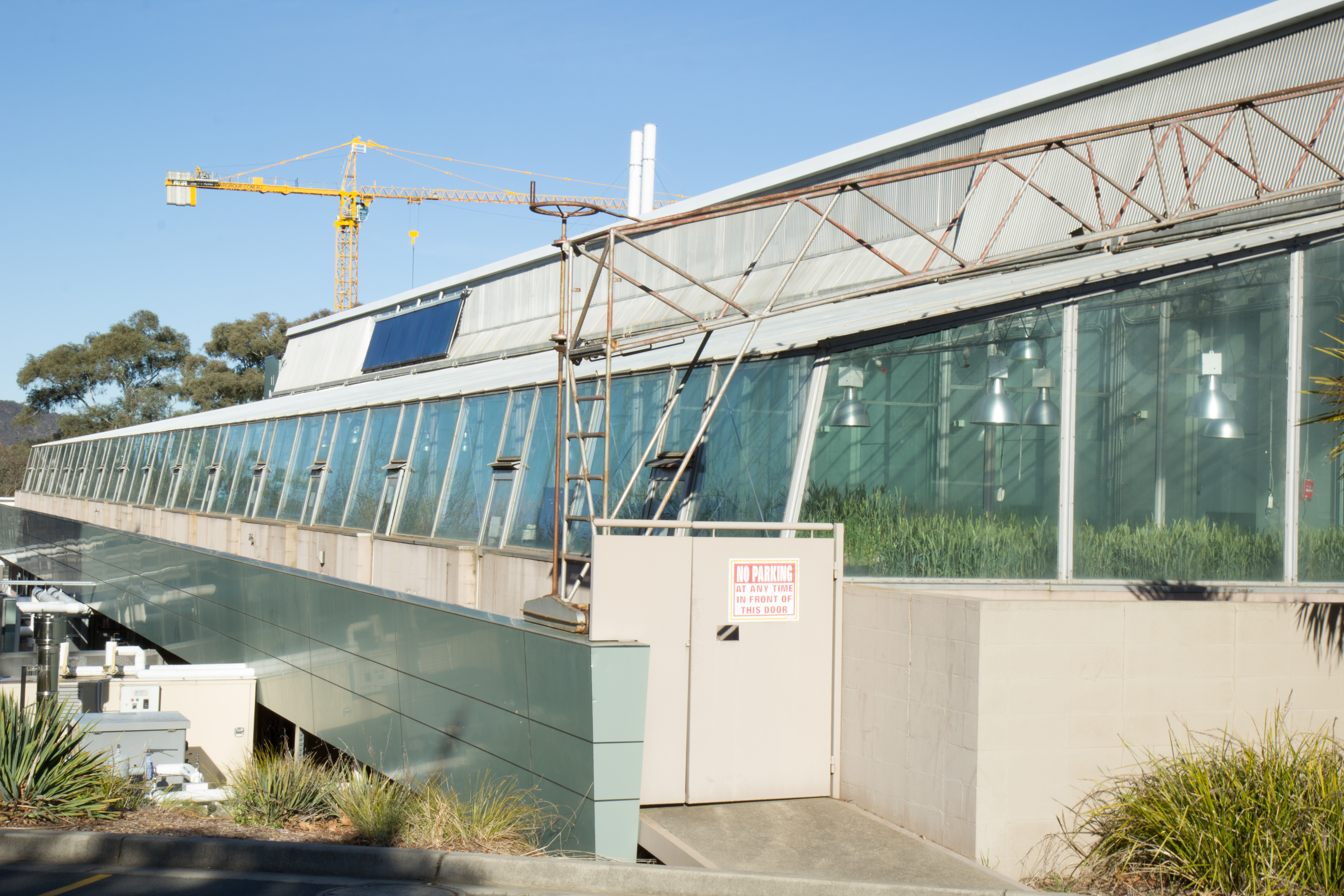
Commonwealth Scientific and Industrial Research Organisation (CSIRO)'s phytotron in Canberra, Australia

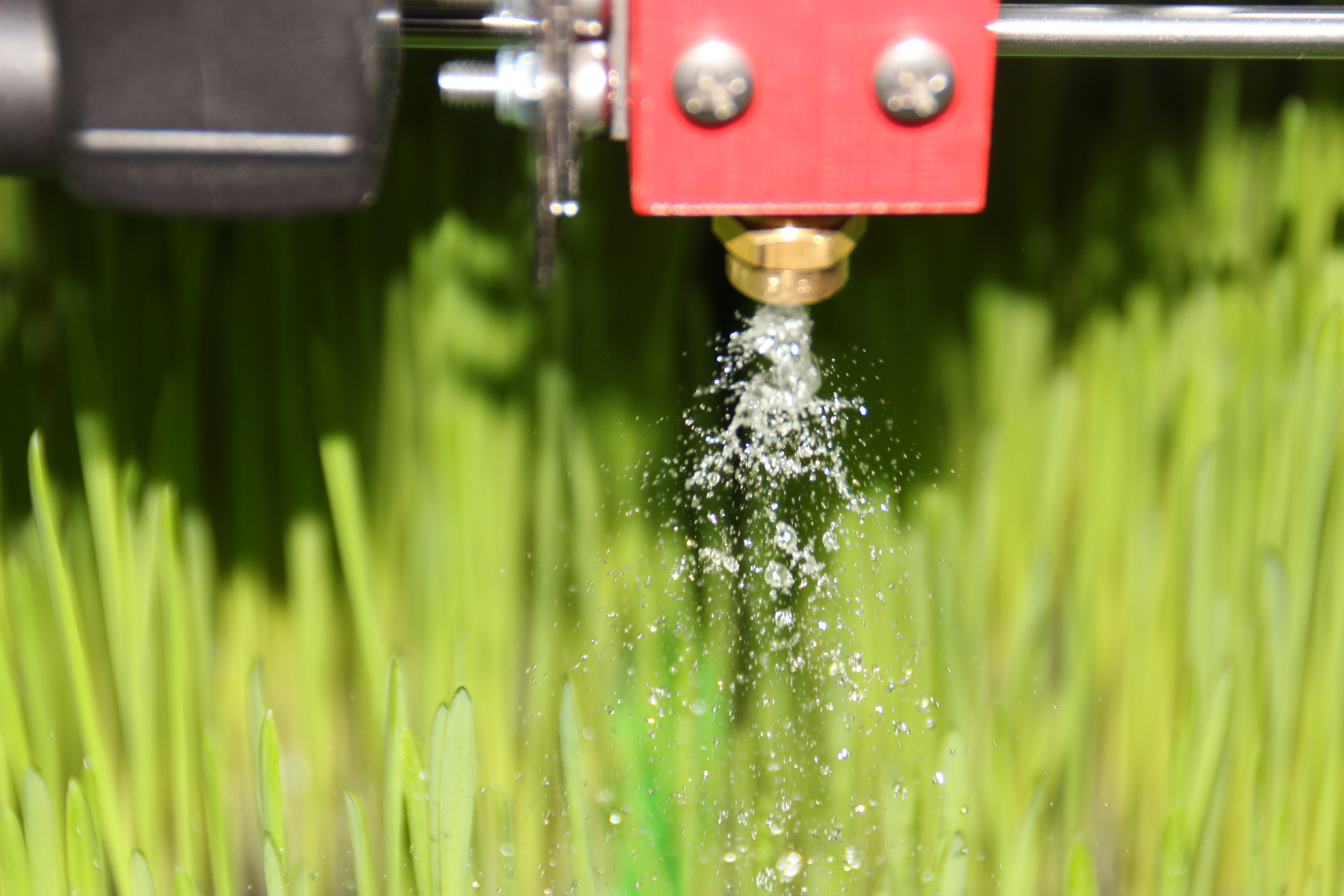
A fertilizing robot and a phytotron at the laboratory of the Biogenet company in Józefów, Poland

Phytotrons unified and extended earlier piecemeal efforts to claim total control of the whole environment. In both walk-in rooms and smaller reach-in cabinets, phytotrons produced and reproduced whole complex climates of many variables. In the first phytotrons each individual room was held at a constant unique temperature. The Australian phytotron, for example, had rooms maintaining 9 °C, 12 °C, 16 °C, 20 °C, 23 °C, 26 °C, 30 °C, 34 °C. Because some of the earliest controlled environment experiments showed that plants reacted differently in daytime temperatures and nighttime temperatures, the first experiments to observe the effect(s) of varying the daytime versus the nighttime temperature saw experimenters move their plants from higher to lower temperatures over the course of a daily, or any other variable or constant, routine. This rendered the variable “temperature” experimentally controllable.

Even a brute force approach that tested each successive environmental variable and every variety of plant would serve to pinpoint specific environmental conditions to maximize growth. Expecting that more knowledge would surely come from greater technology, the next generation of phytotrons expanded in technological reach, in their ranges of environmental variables, and also in the degree of control over each variable. The phytotron in Stockholm offered a humidity controlled room and a custom built computer, as well as a low temperature room that extended the temperature range down to -25 °C for the study of Nordic forests. After that, phytotron technology compressed whole environments into smaller cabinets able to be set to any desired combination of environmental conditions, which are still in use today.

== History ==
The first phytotron was built under the direction of Frits Warmolt Went at the California Institute of Technology in 1949. It was funded by the Earhart Foundation, and was officially known as the Earhart Plant Research Laboratory. It acquired its more distinctive nickname evidently from a joking conversation between Caltech biologists James Bonner and Sam Wildman. Recalling the origin sometime in 1980s Bonner noted that:

"The Earhart Plant Research Laboratory [was] called an environmentally controlled greenhouse but my first postdoctoral fellow [Sam Wildman] and I, sitting around about 1950, having coffee, decided it deserved a better or more euphonious name [...]. We decided to call it a phytotron—phytos from the Greek word for plant, and tron as in cyclotron, a big complicated machine. Went was originally enormously annoyed by this word. But Dr. Millikan took it right up saying, ‘this edifice financed by Mr. Earhart, is going to do for plant biology what the cyclotron has done for physics', and he christened it a phytotron."

Phytotrons spread around the world between 1945 and the present day to Australia, France, Hungary, the Soviet Union, England, and the United States. Moreover, they have spurred variants such as the Climatron at the Missouri Botanical Garden, the Biotron at the University of Wisconsin-Madison, the Ecotron at Imperial College London and the Brisatron at the Savannah River Ecology Laboratory.

== See also ==
- Biotron (disambiguation)
