= MELiSSA =

European Space Agency led consortium developing life support systems for space missions

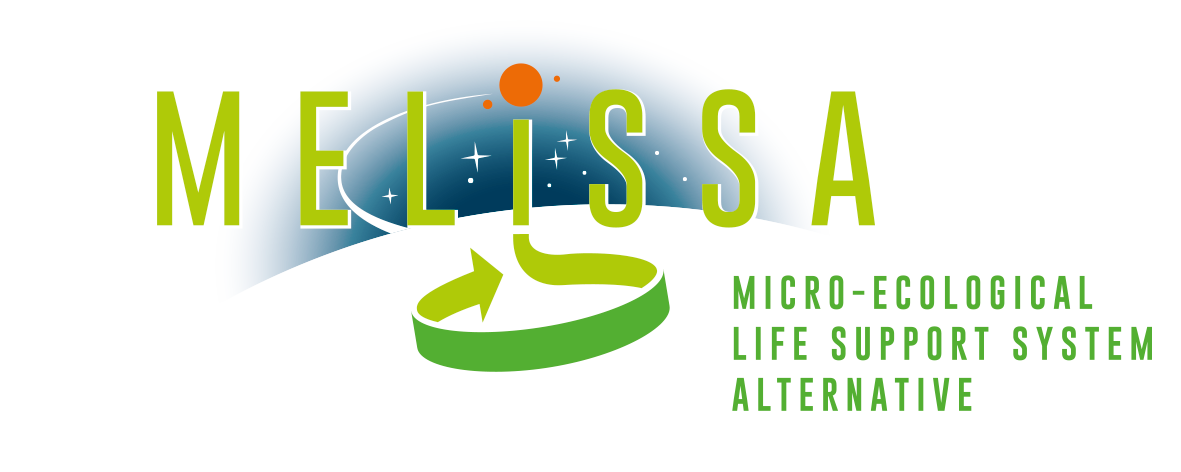

The Micro-Ecological Life Support System Alternative (MELiSSA) is a European Space Agency (ESA) initiative with the aim to develop the technology for a future regenerative life support system for long-term human space missions. Initiated in 1989, the design is inspired by a terrestrial ecosystem. As of 2023, MELiSSA is a consortium made up of 30 organisations across Europe.

== Life support concept ==
Space missions involving humans require essential resources to sustain life. Approximately 3.56 kg of drinkable water and 26 kg of water for hygiene is needed for each person per day. The longer and further the missions are, the more difficult and costly it becomes to supply resources. MELiSSA's aim is to ideally create an artificially closed ecosystem to autonomously recycle the wastes to oxygen, water and food with only the input of energy to drive the process.

== MELiSSA loop ==
The loop is made up of 4 compartments with the crew members at the centre. The compartments are:

- The liquefying compartment (compartment 1):

This compartment is the collection point for all mission waste, such as urea and kitchen waste, as well as the non-edible parts of the higher plant compartment (i.e. straw and roots). The compartment's aim is to anaerobically transform this waste to ammonium, H_{2}, CO_{2}, volatile fatty acids and minerals. For biosafety reasons and for optimum degradation efficiency, the compartment operates in thermophilic conditions (55 °C). The process of degradation in this compartment is carried out by proteolysis, saccharolysis and cellulolysis.

- The photoheterotrophic compartment (compartment 2):

This compartment is responsible for the elimination of the terminal products of the liquefying compartment; mainly the volatile fatty acids.

- The nitrifying compartment (compartment 3):

The nitrifying compartment's main function is to cycle NH_{4}^{+} produced from waste to nitrates, which is the most favourable source of nitrogen for higher plants as well as Arthrospira platensis. The compartment is composed of a mix of Nitrosomonas and Nitrobacter which oxidise NH_{4}^{+} to NO_{2}^{−} and NO_{2}^{−} to NO_{3}^{−}, respectively. As this compartment is a fixed bed reactor, the importance of the hydrodynamic factors is slightly more important as well as more complicated.

- The photoautotrophic compartment (compartment 4):

The fourth compartment is split into two parts: the algae compartment, colonised by the cyanobacteria Arthrospira platensis, and the higher plant compartment. These compartments are essential for the regeneration of oxygen and the production of food.

== Operating principle of an artificial ecosystem ==
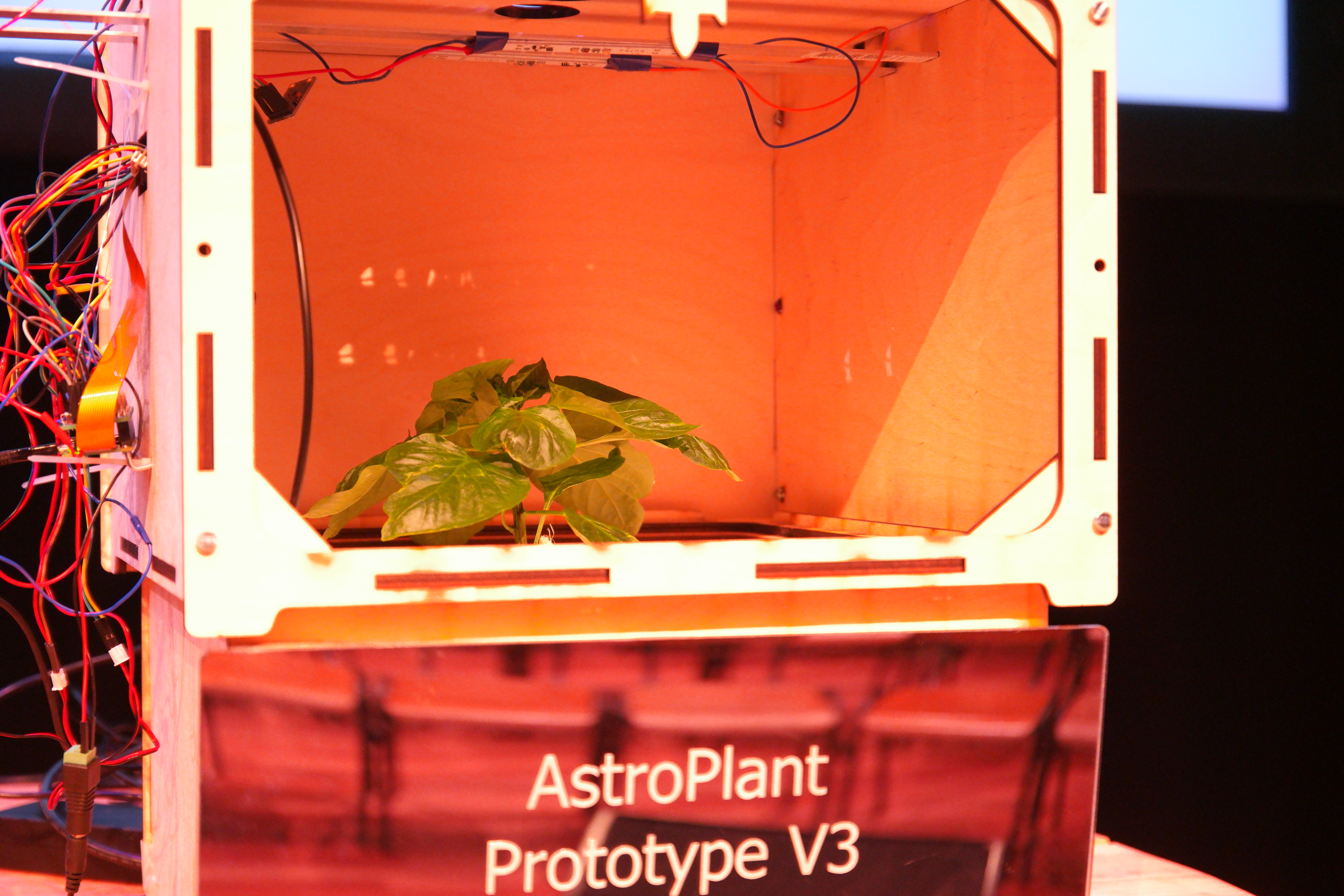
The AstroPlant initiative of MELiSSA recruits citizen scientists to help create systems for potential space farming projects

A closed ecosystem can be thought of as a mass balance between the major elements, carbon, hydrogen, oxygen, nitrogen, sulphur and phosphorus (CHONSP), which alone represent 95% of the mass to recycle. The conversion of waste elements to resources, which can be used by crew members, can be achieved by two means: physiochemically or biologically. Physiochemical processes such as the Sabatier reaction would result in high efficiencies, but a large amount of energy is required in terms of temperature and pressure. In biological processes, using photosynthesis, efficiencies are lower, but ambient temperatures and pressures can be used. Photosynthesis is the process whereby plants convert light energy into chemical energy of sugars and other organic compounds. The chemical reactions utilise carbon and water with the by-product of oxygen, released into the atmosphere. MELiSSA is partly based on these photosynthetic reactions: recycling carbon dioxide into oxygen. Higher plants (wheat, rice, salad ingredients) would be utilised to produce food for the crew members. Photosynthetic micro-organisms would also be used to transform carbon dioxide into oxygen with the possibility of using the micro-organism of choice as part of the food intake, as an essential protein resource.

== Distinctive features of the artificial ecosystem ==
Unlike a natural ecosystem, which is regulated by the interaction of many different species; an artificially closed ecosystem has a reduced number of steps and it is sized and controlled to reach the desired objectives. It is akin to industrial processes, transforming raw materials into useful substances. However, one key difference is the targeted objective to recycle near 100% of wastes (limiting feed stock), essentially operating MELiSSA in a closed loop.

Achieving near 100% for the major elements is theoretical. When compared to natural ecosystems, even Earth is not a truly closed system: every year, thousands of tons of meteoric matter fall to Earth from space, while thousands of tons of hydrogen and helium escape Earth's atmosphere. Further, an artificial ecosystem is inherently dynamic; MELiSSA has to respond very quickly to changes in human behaviour. This requires a dynamic control system which is developed for each step of the process and the system as a whole.

== Pilot plant ==
External videos
- MELiSSA Space Research Program – film highlights a brief introduction to the research program and information presented on the current Pilot Plant

The current MELiSSA Pilot Plant is located at Universitat Autònoma de Barcelona and was inaugurated in 2009. It is the place where the results obtained by the MELiSSA international team are integrated and tested. The final goal of the operation of the Pilot Plant is to demonstrate, evaluate and improve the feasibility of the MELiSSA loop concept on ground conditions, in order to guide the future developments towards a regenerative life support system for space applications.
