= Life-support system =

Technology that allows survival in hostile environments

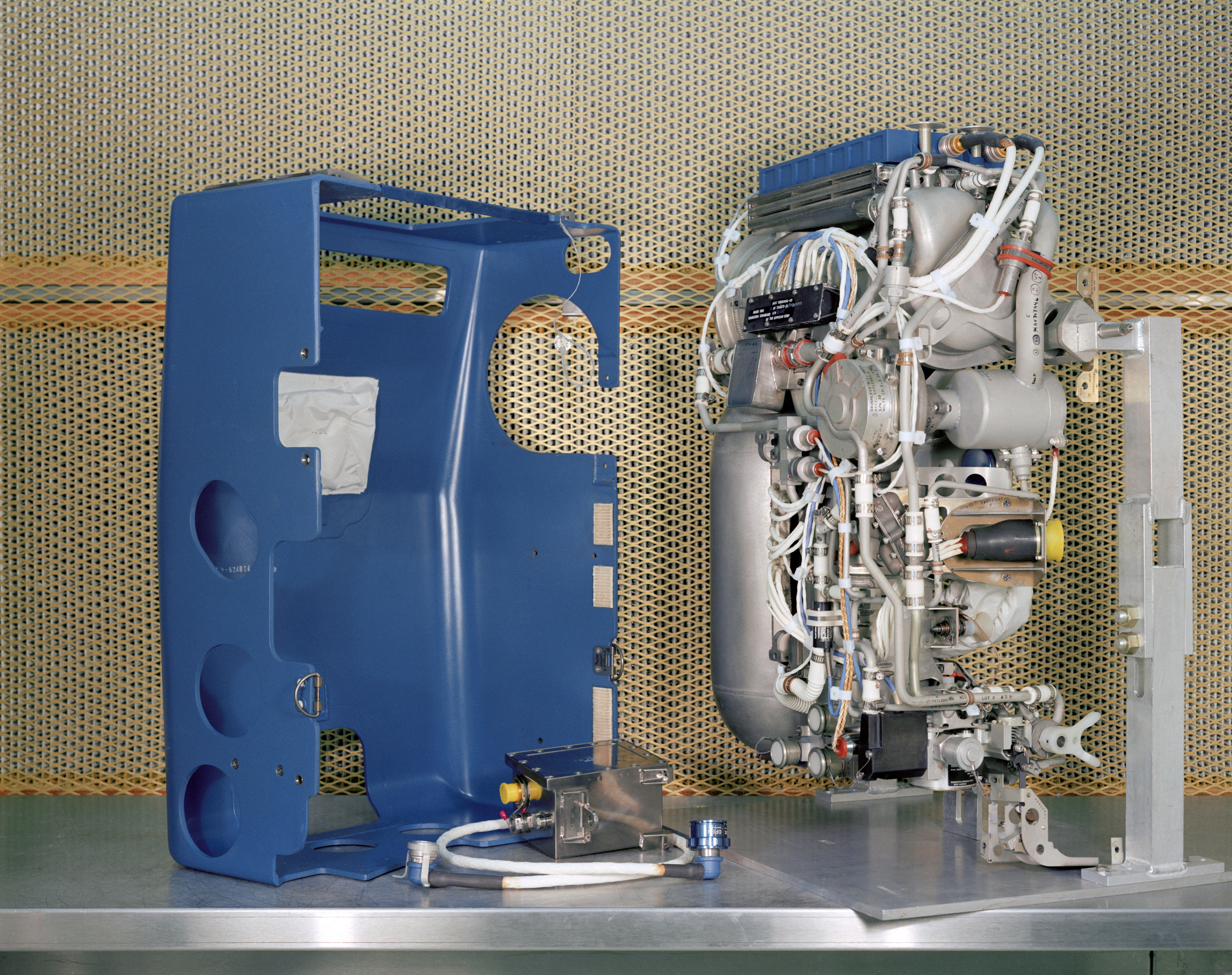
Apollo portable life support system

A life-support system is the combination of equipment that allows survival in an environment or situation that would not support that life in its absence. It is generally applied to the systems supporting human life in situations where the outside environment is hostile, such as outer space or underwater, or medical situations where the health of the person is compromised to the extent that the risk of death would be high without the function of the equipment.

In human spaceflight, a life-support system is a group of devices that allow a human being to survive in outer space. US government space agency NASA, and private spaceflight companies use the phrase "environmental control and life-support system" or the acronym ECLSS when describing these systems. The life-support system may supply air, water and food. It must also maintain the correct body temperature, an acceptable pressure on the body and deal with the body's waste products. Shielding against harmful external influences such as radiation and micro-meteorites may also be necessary. Components of the life-support system are life-critical, and are designed and constructed using safety engineering techniques.

In underwater diving, the breathing apparatus is considered to be life support equipment, and a saturation diving system is considered a life-support system – the personnel who are responsible for operating it are called life support technicians. The concept can also be extended to submarines, crewed submersibles and atmospheric diving suits, where the breathing gas requires treatment to remain respirable, and the occupants are isolated from the outside ambient pressure and temperature.

Medical life-support systems include heart-lung machines, medical ventilators and dialysis equipment.

== Human physiological and metabolic needs ==
A crewmember of typical size requires approximately 5 kilograms (11 lb) of food, water, and oxygen per day to perform standard activities on a space mission, and outputs a similar amount in the form of waste solids, waste liquids, and carbon dioxide. The mass breakdown of these metabolic parameters is as follows: 0.84 kg (1.9 lb) of oxygen, 0.62 kg (1.4 lb) of food, and 3.54 kg (7.8 lb) of water consumed, converted through the body's physiological processes to 0.11 kg (3.9 oz) of solid wastes, 3.89 kg (8.6 lb) of liquid wastes, and 1.00 kg (2.20 lb) of carbon dioxide produced. These levels can vary due to activity level of a specific mission assignment, but must obey the principle of mass balance. Actual water use during space missions is typically double the given value, mainly due to non-biological use (e.g. showering). Additionally, the volume and variety of waste products varies with mission duration to include hair, finger nails, skin flaking, and other biological wastes in missions exceeding one week in length. Other environmental considerations such as radiation, gravity, noise, vibration, and lighting also factor into human physiological response in outer space, though not with the more immediate effect that the metabolic parameters have.

=== Atmosphere ===
Outer space life-support systems maintain atmospheres composed, at a minimum, of oxygen, water vapor and carbon dioxide. The partial pressure of each component gas adds to the overall barometric pressure.

However, the elimination of diluent gases substantially increases fire risks, especially in ground operations when for structural reasons the total cabin pressure must exceed the external atmospheric pressure; see Apollo 1. Furthermore, oxygen toxicity becomes a factor at high oxygen concentrations. For this reason, most modern crewed spacecraft use conventional air (nitrogen/oxygen) atmospheres and use pure oxygen only in pressure suits during extravehicular activity where acceptable suit flexibility mandates the lowest inflation pressure possible.

=== Water ===
Water is consumed by crew members for drinking, cleaning activities, EVA thermal control, and emergency uses. It must be stored, used, and reclaimed (from waste water and exhaled water vapor) efficiently since no on-site sources currently exist for the environments reached in the course of human space exploration. Future lunar missions may utilize water sourced from polar ices; Mars missions may utilize water from the atmosphere or ice deposits.

=== Food ===
All space missions to date have used supplied food. Life-support systems could include a plant cultivation system which allows food to be grown within buildings or vessels. This would also regenerate water and oxygen. However, no such system has flown in outer space as yet. Such a system could be designed so that it reuses most (otherwise lost) nutrients. This is done, for example, by composting toilets which reintegrate waste material (excrement) back into the system, allowing the nutrients to be taken up by the food crops. The food coming from the crops is then consumed again by the system's users and the cycle continues. The logistics and area requirements involved however have been prohibitive in implementing such a system to date.

=== Gravity ===
Depending on the length of the mission, astronauts may need artificial gravity to reduce the effects of space adaptation syndrome, body fluid redistribution, and loss of bone and muscle mass. Two methods of generating artificial weight in outer space exist.

==== Linear acceleration ====
If a spacecraft's engines could produce thrust continuously on the outbound trip with a thrust level equal to the mass of the ship, it would continuously accelerate at the rate of 32.2 feet per second (9.8 m/s) per second, and the crew would experience a pull toward the ship's aft bulkhead at normal Earth gravity (one g). The effect is proportional to the rate of acceleration. When the ship reaches the halfway point, it would turn around and produce thrust in the retrograde direction to slow down.

==== Rotation ====
Alternatively, if the ship's cabin is designed with a large cylindrical wall, or with a long beam extending another cabin section or counterweight, spinning it at an appropriate speed will cause centrifugal force to simulate the effect of gravity. If ω is the angular velocity of the ship's spin, then the acceleration at a radius r is:

$g = \omega^2 r$

Notice the magnitude of this effect varies with the radius of rotation, which crewmembers might find inconvenient depending on the cabin design. Also, the effects of Coriolis force (a force imparted at right angles to motion within the cabin) must be dealt with. And there is concern that rotation could aggravate the effects of vestibular disruption.

=== Radiation protection ===
Life support systems for long-term space missions will need to protect the crew from space radiation, to reduce the risk of cancer development and safeguard astronaut health. Future missions may use radiation-resistant fungi-derived paints, to coat the walls of spacecraft.

== Space vehicle systems ==
=== Gemini, Mercury, and Apollo ===
American Mercury, Gemini and Apollo spacecraft contained 100% oxygen atmospheres, suitable for short duration missions, to minimize weight and complexity.

=== Space Shuttle ===
The Space Shuttle was the first American spacecraft to have an Earth-like atmospheric mixture, comprising 22% oxygen and 78% nitrogen. For the Space Shuttle, NASA includes in the ECLSS category systems that provide both life support for the crew and environmental control for payloads. The Shuttle Reference Manual contains ECLSS sections on: Crew Compartment Cabin Pressurization, Cabin Air Revitalization, Water Coolant Loop System, Active Thermal Control System, Supply and Waste Water, Waste Collection System, Waste Water Tank, Airlock Support, Extravehicular Mobility Units, Crew Altitude Protection System, and Radioisotope Thermoelectric Generator Cooling and Gaseous Nitrogen Purge for Payloads.

=== Soyuz ===
The life-support system on the Soyuz spacecraft is called the Kompleks Sredstv Obespecheniya Zhiznideyatelnosti (KSOZh) (Russian: Комплекс Средств Обеспечения Жизнедеятельности (KCOЖ)). Vostok, Voshkod and Soyuz contained air-like mixtures at approximately 101kPa (14.7 psi). The life support system provides a nitrogen/oxygen atmosphere at sea level partial pressures. The atmosphere is then regenerated through KO2 cylinders, which absorb most of the CO_{2} and water produced by the crew biologically and regenerates the oxygen, the LiOH cylinders then absorb the leftover CO_{2}.

=== Plug and play ===
The Paragon Space Development Corporation is developing a plug and play ECLSS called commercial crew transport-air revitalization system (CCT-ARS) for future spacecraft partially paid for using NASA's Commercial Crew Development (CCDev) funding.

The CCT-ARS provides seven primary spacecraft life support functions in an integrated system: Air temperature control, Humidity removal, Carbon dioxide removal, Trace contaminant removal, Post-fire atmospheric recovery, Air filtration, and Cabin air circulation.

== Space station systems ==
Space station systems include technology that enables humans to live in outer space for a prolonged period of time. Such technology includes filtration systems for human waste disposal and air production.

=== Skylab ===
Skylab used 72% oxygen and 28% nitrogen at a total pressure of 5 psi.

=== Salyut and Mir ===
The Salyut and Mir space stations contained an air-like Oxygen and Nitrogen mixture at approximately sea-level pressures of 93.1 kPa (13.5psi) to 129 kPa (18.8 psi) with an Oxygen content of 21% to 40%.

=== Bigelow commercial space station ===
The life-support system for the Bigelow Commercial Space Station is being designed by Bigelow Aerospace in Las Vegas, Nevada. The space station will be constructed of habitable Sundancer and BA 330 expandable spacecraft modules. As of October 2010, "human-in-the-loop testing of the environmental control and life-support system (ECLSS)" for Sundancer has begun.

== Natural systems ==
Natural LSS like the Biosphere 2 in Arizona have been tested for future space travel or colonization. These systems are also known as closed ecological systems. They have the advantage of using solar energy as primary energy only and being independent from logistical support with fuel. Natural systems have the highest degree of efficiency due to integration of multiple functions. They also provide the proper ambience for humans which is necessary for a longer stay in outer space.

== Underwater and saturation diving habitats ==
Underwater habitats and surface saturation accommodation facilities provide life-support for their occupants over periods of days to weeks. The occupants are constrained from immediate return to surface atmospheric pressure by decompression obligations of up to several weeks.

The life support system of a surface saturation accommodation facility provides breathing gas and other services to support life for the personnel under pressure. It includes the following components: Underwater habitats differ in that the ambient external pressure is the same as internal pressure, so some engineering problems are simplified.

- Gas compression, mixing and storage facilities
- Chamber climate control system – control of temperature and humidity, and filtration of gas
- Instrumentation, control, monitoring and communications equipment
- Fire suppression systems
- Sanitation systems

Underwater habitats balance internal pressure with the ambient external pressure, allowing the occupants free access to the ambient environment within a specific depth range, while saturation divers accommodated in surface systems are transferred under pressure to the working depth in a closed diving bell

The life support system for the bell provides and monitors the main supply of breathing gas, and the control station monitors the deployment and communications with the divers. Primary gas supply, power and communications to the bell are through a bell umbilical, made up from a number of hoses and electrical cables twisted together and deployed as a unit. This is extended to the divers through the diver umbilicals.

The accommodation life support system maintains the chamber environment within the acceptable range for health and comfort of the occupants. Temperature, humidity, breathing gas quality sanitation systems and equipment function are monitored and controlled.

== Experimental life-support systems ==
=== MELiSSA ===
Micro-Ecological Life Support System Alternative (MELiSSA) is a European Space Agency led initiative, conceived as a micro-organisms and higher plants based ecosystem intended as a tool to gain understanding of the behaviour of artificial ecosystems, and for the development of the technology for a future regenerative life-support system for long term crewed space missions.

=== CyBLiSS ===
CyBLiSS ("Cyanobacterium-Based Life Support Systems") is a concept developed by researchers from several space agencies (NASA, the German Aerospace Center and the Italian Space Agency) which would use cyanobacteria to process resources available on Mars directly into useful products, and into substrates for other key organisms of Bioregenerative life support system (BLSS). The goal is to make future human-occupied outposts on Mars as independent of Earth as possible (explorers living "off the land"), to reduce mission costs and increase safety. Even though developed independently, CyBLiSS would be complementary to other BLSS projects (such as MELiSSA) as it can connect them to materials found on Mars, thereby making them sustainable and expandable there. Instead of relying on a closed loop, new elements found on site can be brought into the system.

== See also ==
- Bioregenerative life support system (BLSS) – Artificial ecosystem
- Closed ecological system – Ecosystem that does not exchange matter with the exterior
- Effect of spaceflight on the human body – Medical issues associated with spaceflight
- Environmental control system – Aircraft system which maintains internal pressurization, climate, air supply, and more
- International Conference on Environmental Systems – Conference on human spaceflight technology and space human factors
- ISS ECLSS – International Space Station life-support system
- Primary life support system – Life support device for a space suit
- Saturation diving system – Facility for supporting saturation diving projects
- Spacecraft thermal control – Process of keeping all parts of a spacecraft within acceptable temperature ranges
- Submarine#Life support systems – Watercraft capable of independent underwater operation
