= Elisa de Lamartine =

French painter

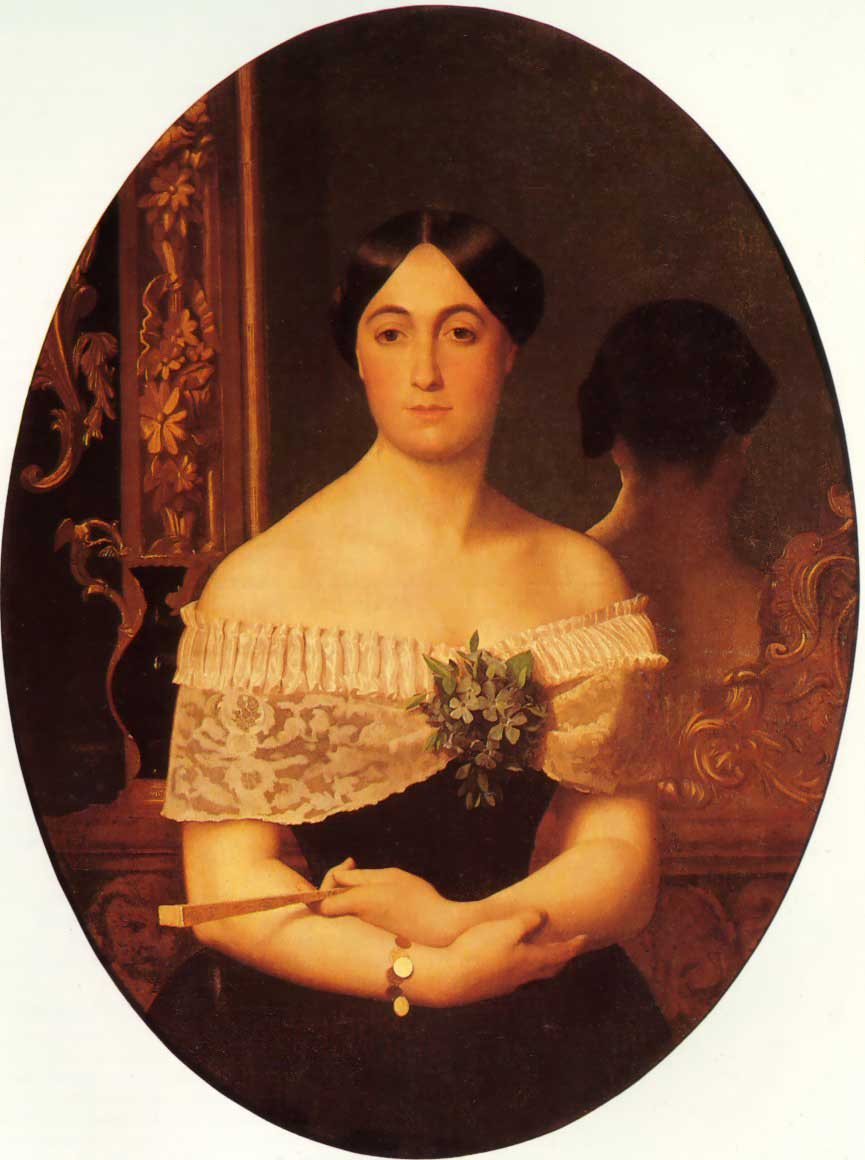
- Portrait of Mme de Lamartine by Jean-Léon Gérôme (1849)
- Born: Mary Ann Elisa Birch; 13 March 1790; Languedoc, France
- Died: 24 May 1863 (aged 73); Paris, France
- Other names: Marianne de Lamartine, Mary Ann de Lamartine
- Occupations: painter and sculptor
- Spouse: Alphonse de Lamartine (m. 1820–1863)
- Children: Alphonse de Lamartine (1821–1822); Julia de Lamartine (1822–1832)

Elisa de Lamartine (born Mary Ann Elisa Birch; 1790–1863), also known as Marianne de Lamartine, was a French painter and sculptor believed to be of English ancestry.

== Biography ==
The artist was born 13 March 1790, in Languedoc, France. (Some sources say she was born in London, but that has not been substantiated.) She was the daughter of Major William Henry Birch and Christina Cordelia Reessen, and was baptized on 31 May 1792 at the parish of Saint Anne in Soho, City of Westminster, in London.

Elisa married the writer and poet Alphonse de Lamartine (1790-1869) in the church of Saint-Pierre de Maché, in Chambéry, France, on 6 June 1820. The couple had two children: Félix Marie Emilius Alphonse de Lamartine (born in Rome, Italy in 1821 and died in Paris in December 1822 of fever before reaching two) and Marie Louise Julie de Lamartine, known as Julia, (born in Mâcon, France 14 May 1822). Julia died in Beirut, Lebanon in 1832, at ten years of age, during a family expedition to Lebanon, Syria and the Holy Land in 1832–33.

Elisa died on 24 May 1863 in Paris at age 73.

== Exhibits and works ==
In 2003, as part of the Lamartine biennial celebrations, an exhibition was dedicated to the artist titled, Evocation of Marianne de Lamartine at the Musee Lamartine in Macon, France.

In 1843, Lamartine worked with her teacher, the sculptor François Jouffroy, on a font made of Trinitarian marble at the church of St. Germain l'Auxerrois in Paris, which was described as "a holy water font executed on the drawings of Mme de Lamartine, puppets parading around a cross."

== Selected work in public collections ==
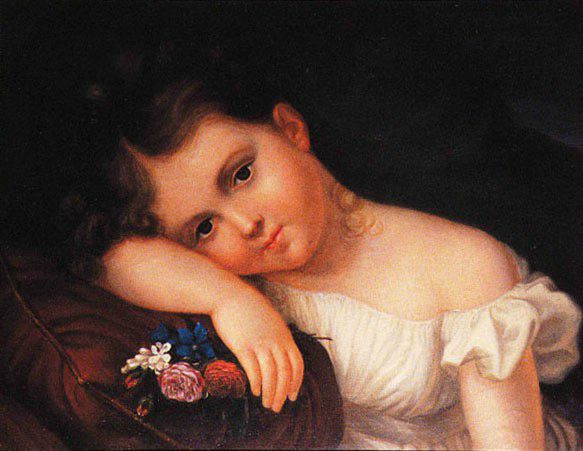
Portrait of daughter Julia by Mme de Larmartine

Lamartine was known as a painter, watercolorist, sculptor, draftswoman, illustrator and musician.

- Mâcon, Lamartine Museum: La Saône et La Loire, 1847, plaster models of a decoration project (not carried out) for the Saint-Laurent bridge in Mâcon.
- Mâcon, Ursuline Museum: Roman Charity, oil on canvas; and Urania, oil on canvas.
- Paris, Museum of Romantic Life: The Flowers on the Altar, circa 1846, autograph poem by Alphonse de Lamartine, illuminated by Elisa de Lamartine.
- Saint-Point, Château de Saint-Point: Portrait of Marie Louise Julie de Lamartine, oil on canvas

== Portraits of the artist ==
- Jean-Léon Gérôme, Portrait of Madame de Lamartine, 1849, Montauban, Ingres Museum.
- François Claudius Compte-Calix, Madame de Lamartine Adopting the Children of Patriots Slain at the Barricades in Paris during the Revolution of 1848, Barnard Castle, Bowes Museum.
- Johann Ender, Portrait of Mary Ann Elisa Birch (1790-1863), 1821, drawing engraved by Thomas-Casimir Regnault. A copy of the engraving is kept at the Palace of Versailles.
