= Voyage en Orient (Lamartine) =

1835 book by Alphonse de Lamartine

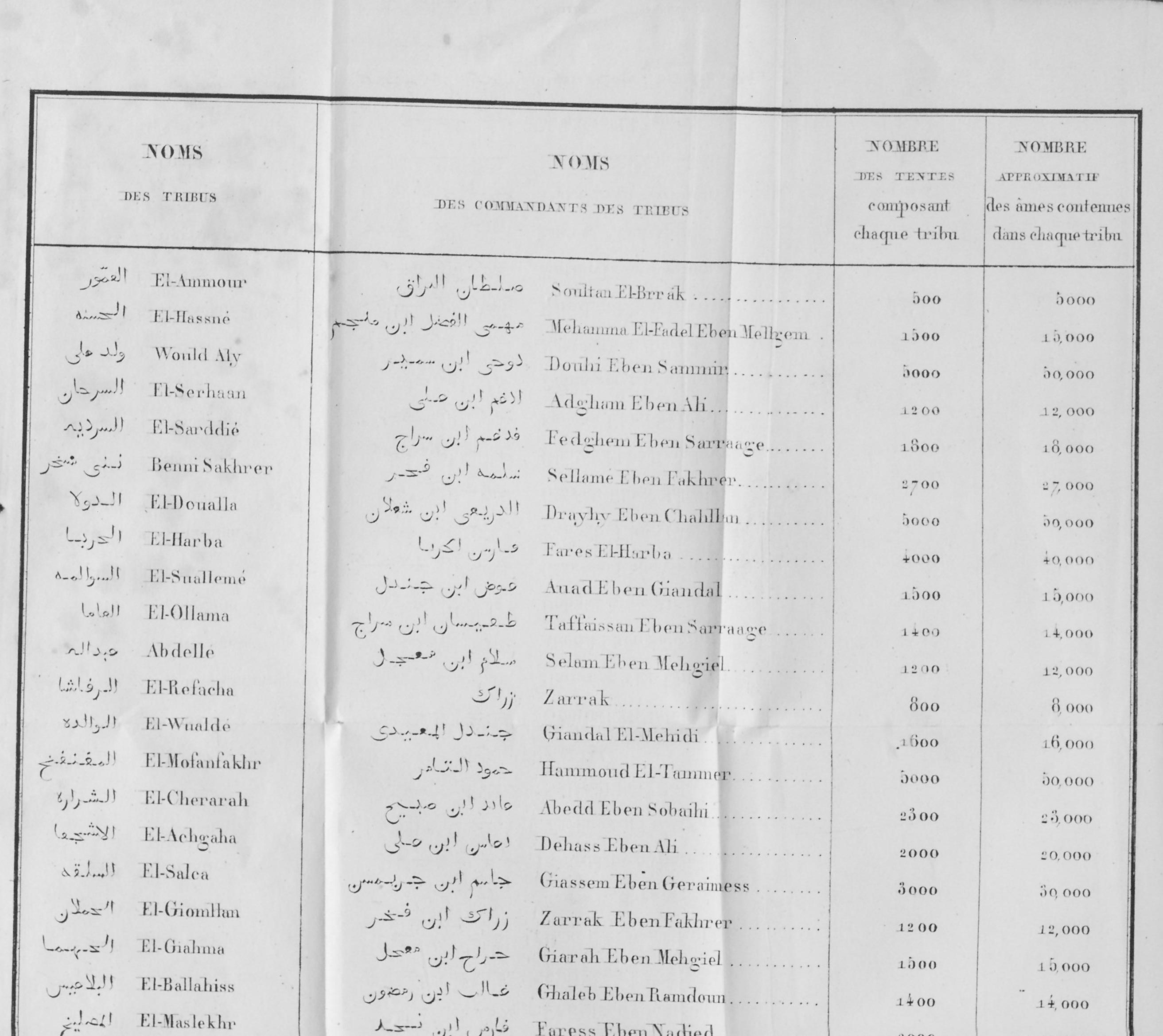
Table comprising the names of Oriental tribes, their leaders, and the numbers of people living in these very tribes, translated from Arabic in Voyage en Orient (1835)

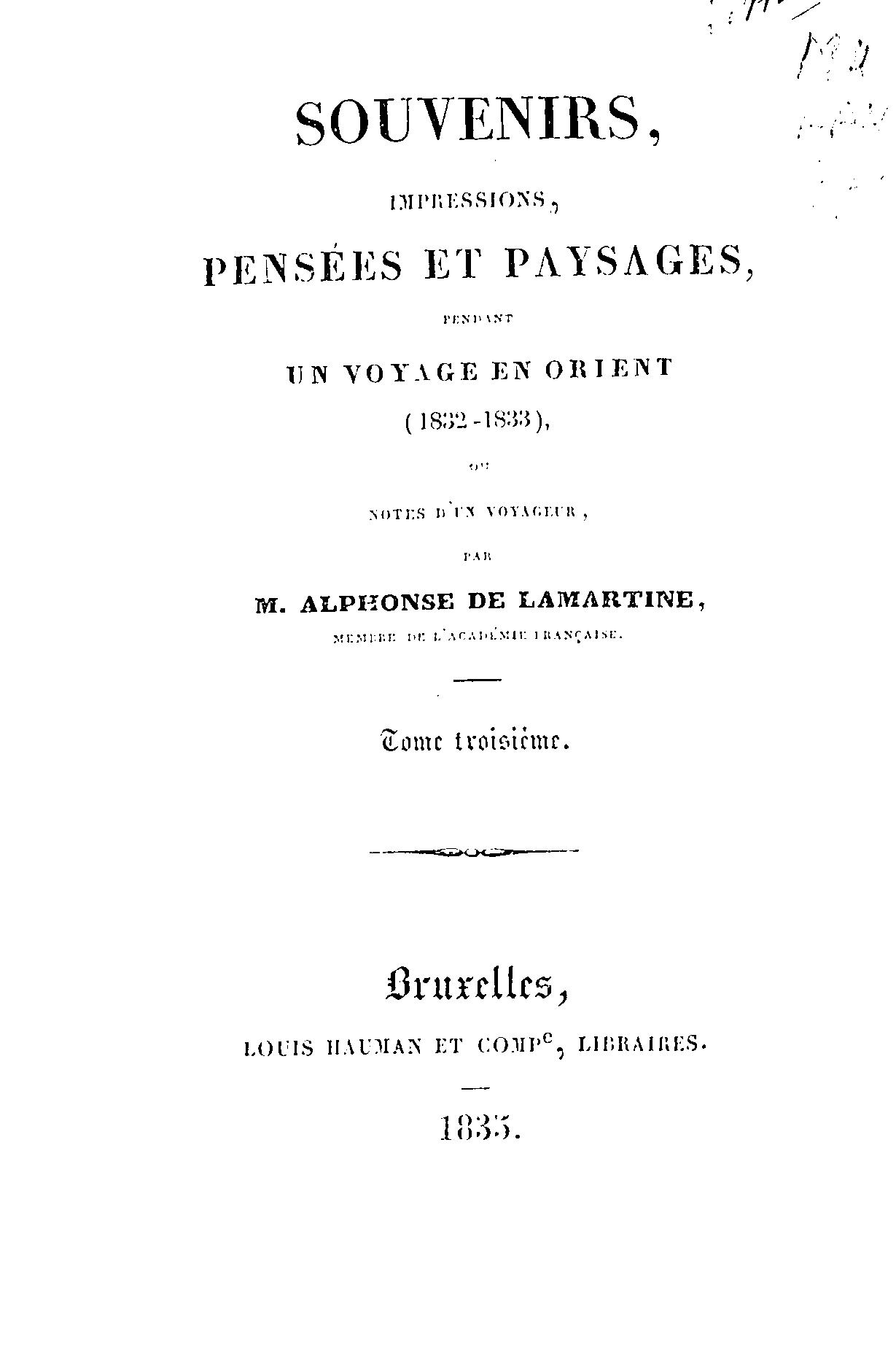
Title page of Voyage en Orient (1835)

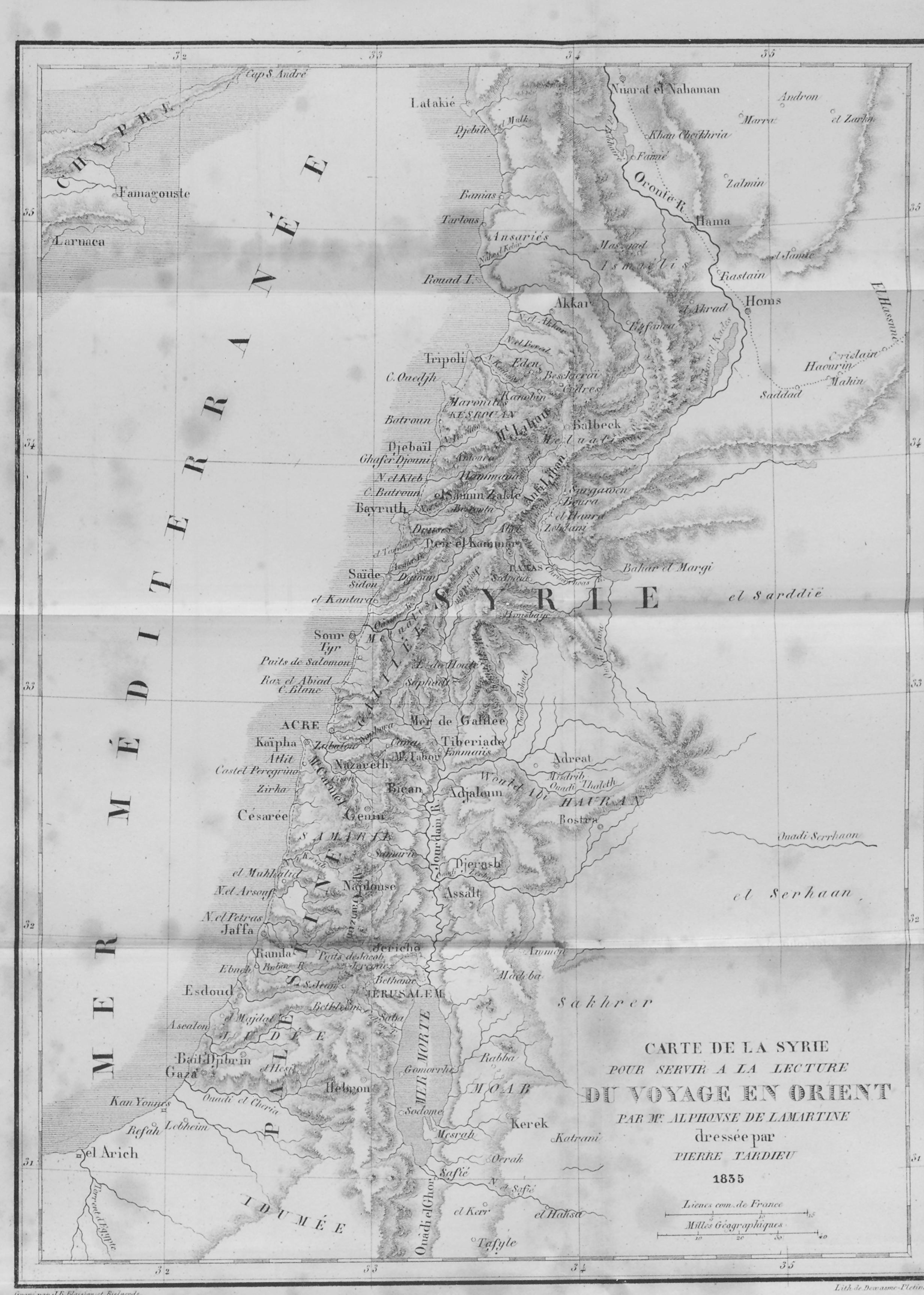
Map of Syria in Voyage en Orient (1835)

Impressions, souvenirs, pensées et paysages pendant un voyage en Orient, 1832–1833, ou Notes d'un voyageur, shortened to Voyage en Orient, is a travel journal written by Alphonse de Lamartine. This book narrates Lamartine's journey to several Middle Eastern regions now known as Turkey, Lebanon, palestine, and Syria but also South Eastern European countries such as Cyprus, Greece, Bulgaria, and Serbia. The book was published in 1835, and is divided in four volumes, comprising a total of 1260 pages.

== Context ==
In the early nineteenth century, Romanticism was the leading literary movement in France and Lamartine was one of its prominent figures. The French romantic literature fostered a growing curiosity about foreign cultures, particularly the Eastern ones. During Lamartine's time, romantic authors and artists travelled in many regions of the world, with the Orient being one of their favorite destinations. The sparked interest in the region was prompted by romantic artists’ need of self-discovery, which could be fulfilled by going to the Orient, due to the moral and political values that the region upheld, which were seen as antithetical to the West. This Orientalist desire laid the focus on both on personal experience and the need to find meaning through traveling.

Lamartine's travel to the Orient was also politically motivated. Before embarking on his Oriental journey, Lamartine rallied to the July Monarchy and faced a political failure, as he was not elected as a deputy in 1831. He therefore decided to leave France to travel to the Orient because he needed to take a break from politics. While traveling, Lamartine's political convictions shifted as he progressively distanced himself from being a conservative to become a well-known liberal adhering to French republicanism. Another incentive for leaving his country was religion and this quest for faith sprung after the death of his mother in 1829 who raised him as a Christian. Lamartine realized that it was important to recover his faith, which has been fading away throughout the years. An additional reason for him to leave his country was that the Orient had always fascinated Lamartine and that he long dreamt about visiting this part of the world. Prior to visiting the Orient, Lamartine did not travel extensively, as he only went to Italy for eight months in 1811, when he was a diplomat.

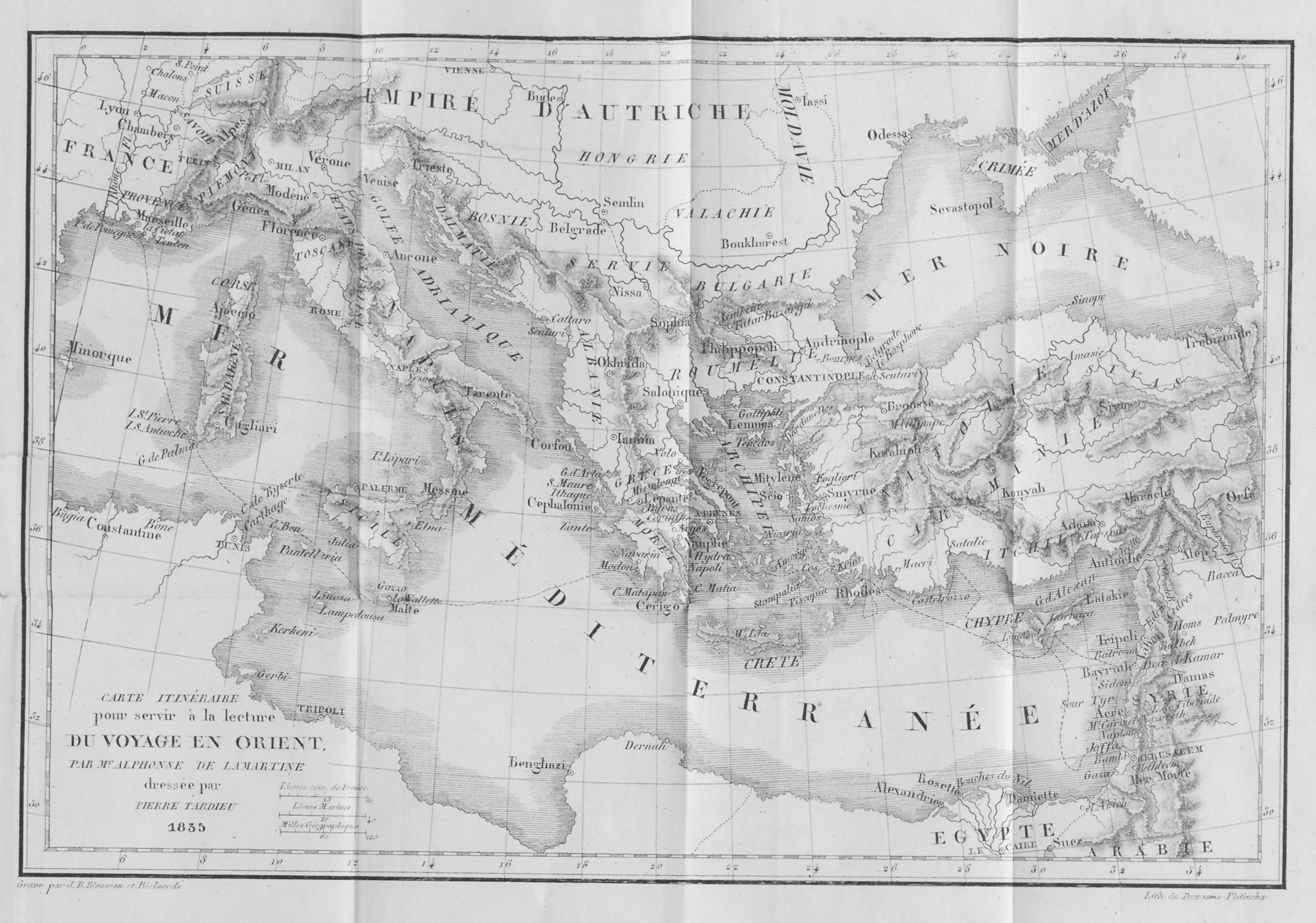
Map of the Mediterranean in Voyage en Orient (1835)

== Contents ==
Voyage en Orient is presented as a travel diary in which Lamartine provides descriptions of landscapes, his impressions and feelings while traveling to the Orient. His trip lasted for 18 months and he was accompanied by his wife and daughter. In the preface, Lamartine claims that Voyage en Orient is neither a book nor a travel account. He argues that his notes were meant for him alone and that he did not think about his audience while writing. In each of the 4 volumes, the chapters are divided either by regions ("Jérusalem") or by themes ("Visite à Lady Esther Stanhope").

The first volume of Voyage en Orient reports Lamartine's travels through modern day Lebanon. His journey began on 11 July 1832 when he left Marseilles with his wife and daughter. They arrived in Beirut on 6 September of the same year. During this trip, Lamartine wrote extensively about his encounter with Lady Hester Stanhope and Bashir Shihab II.

In the second volume, Lamartine is still in Lebanon. On 1 October 1832, he goes to the Holy Land and comes back to Lebanon in November. When he came back to Beirut, Lamartine's lost his daughter, Julia, who died from tuberculosis.

In third volume, Lamartine leaves Lebanon in March 1833 and travels through Syria, Cyprus, Greece, Turkey, Bulgaria and Serbia.

The fourth and final volume of his travel account, Lamartine writes summaries about his stay in Serbia, religion, and politics. He also includes fragments of poems translated from Arabic.

== Publication history ==
Impressions, souvenirs, pensées et paysages pendant un voyage en Orient, 1832-1833, ou Notes d'un voyageur was first published in 1835 by Charles Gosselin in Paris. Lamartine's travel account was very popular during the mid-nineteenth and twentieth century. The book was translated in many European languages (e.g. English, German, Dutch, and Italian) and re-edited sixteen times during Lamartine's lifetime.

Since 1841, the shortened title Voyage en Orient has been officially kept.

== Reception ==
After its publication in 1835, Voyage en Orient attracted several criticisms. Lamartine was blamed for his tolerance towards Islam and his writing was judged as unpleasant, as well as redundant, because of his constant notes on how appealing is the Orient in his opinion. Lamartine has also been accused of lying due to the numerous contradictions and errors displayed in his account, which can be exemplified by the dates not coinciding with the reality. For instance, in Voyage en Orient, Lamartine states that he left France in May 1832 but it is well known that he only started his journey in July of the same year.

The scholar Sarga Moussa, a specialist in literary Orientalism and in nineteenth-century travel writing, wrote several academic articles on Voyage en Orient and how Lamartine's depictions of the Orient ran counter the century's conventional prejudices against Oriental civilisations. Moussa supports his arguments by comparing Lamartine with different figures such as the Romantic travel writer Chateaubriand or with one of Lamartine's friends, the doctor Jean-Vaast Delaroière. His comparison shows that Lamartine's vision of the Orient diverged from the century's mainstreamed representations of the Eastern world, particularly with regard to Islam, which Lamartine saw as analogous to Christianity.

Edward Said's analysis of Lamartine's travel account does not draw the same conclusions as Moussa. In Orientalism, he argues that Lamartine's zeal for the region was no different from other Romantic writers and that he was in line with the mainstream depictions of the East. For the postcolonial author, the French poet contributed to the Western gaze because, through the prism of Lamartine's writing, the representation of the Orient remained guided by an imperial and colonial aesthetic that aimed to produce interest for the reader. Said shows that Lamartine asserted in Voyage en Orient that colonial rule and political domination of the Orient was imperative for European powers. Said concludes that in Lamartine's vision the Orient is reborn as European right-to-power over it.
