= Monument to Bernard of Clairvaux (Dijon) =

Statue of Catholic saint Bernard of Clairvaux

- Monument Bernard de Clairvaux
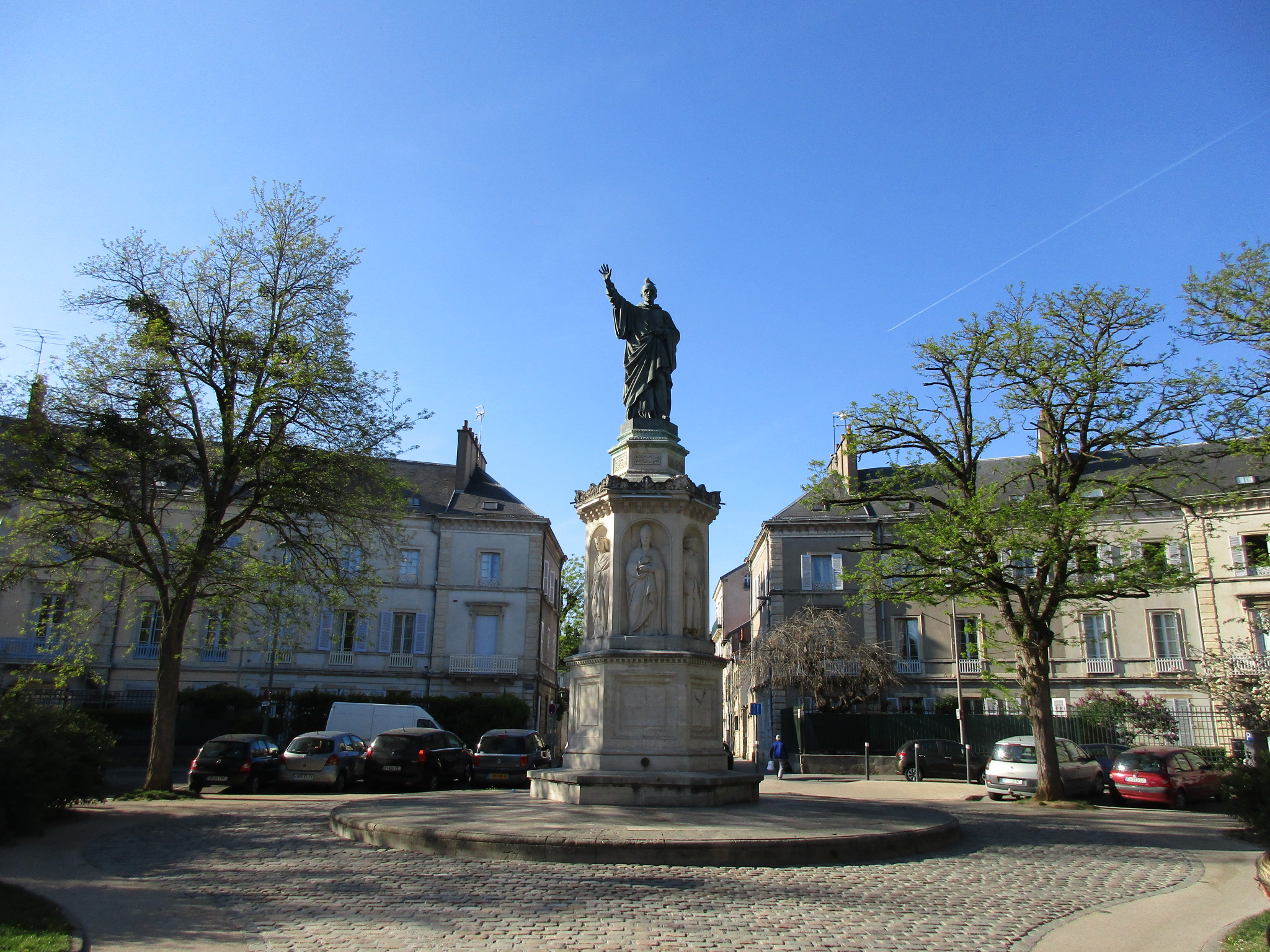
- Place Saint-Bernard
- 47°19′32″N 5°02′20″E
- Location: Place Saint-Bernard (Dijon)
- Designer: Adrien-Léon Lacordaire
- Builder: François Jouffroy
- Type: Statue on a pedestal
- Material: Marble and bronze

The monument to Bernard of Clairvaux at Dijon is a memorial built in 1847 by the dijonnais sculptor François Jouffroy, dedicated to the monk, statesman, preacher, orator and Catholic saint Bernard of Clairvaux (1090-1153), located at the place Saint-Bernard of Dijon, at the French Côte-d'Or department.

== History ==
The place Saint-Bernard was built between 1836 and 1944, at the entrance of the historic district of Dijon, between the place Darcy and the place de la République. It was part of the construction projects of the real estate promoter Adrien-Léon Lacordaire, brother of Henri Lacordaire.

Place Saint-Bernard

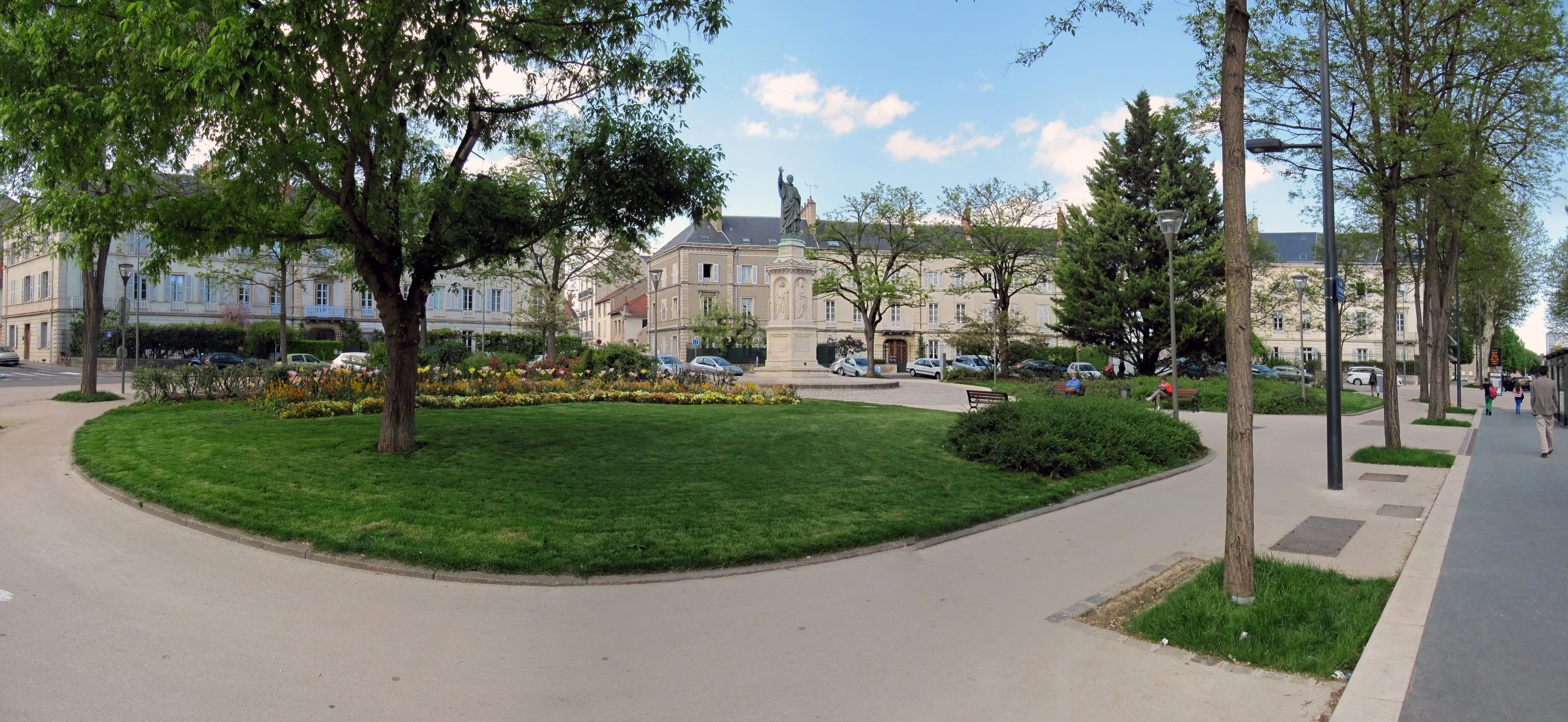

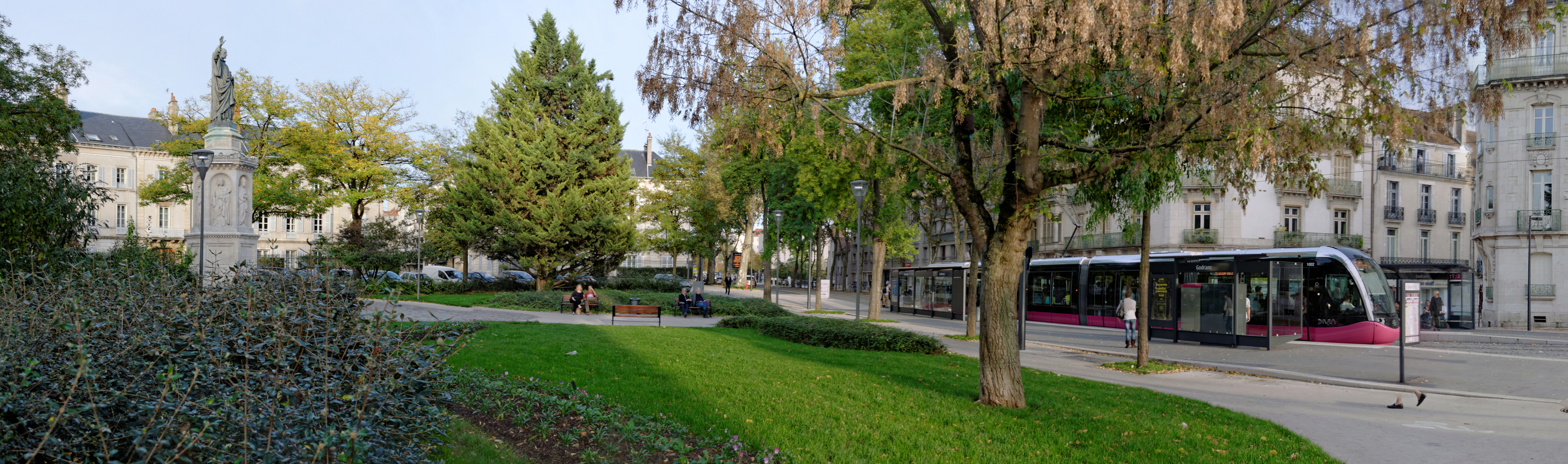

The monument was designed by Adrien-Léon Lacordaire himself, and the figure was sculpted by local François Jouffroy. The ornaments were commissioned to Auguste Forey. It was inaugurated on an originally private space, the 7 November 1847, by the bishop of Dijon and Charles de Montalembert, in a ceremony attended by 5,000 people.

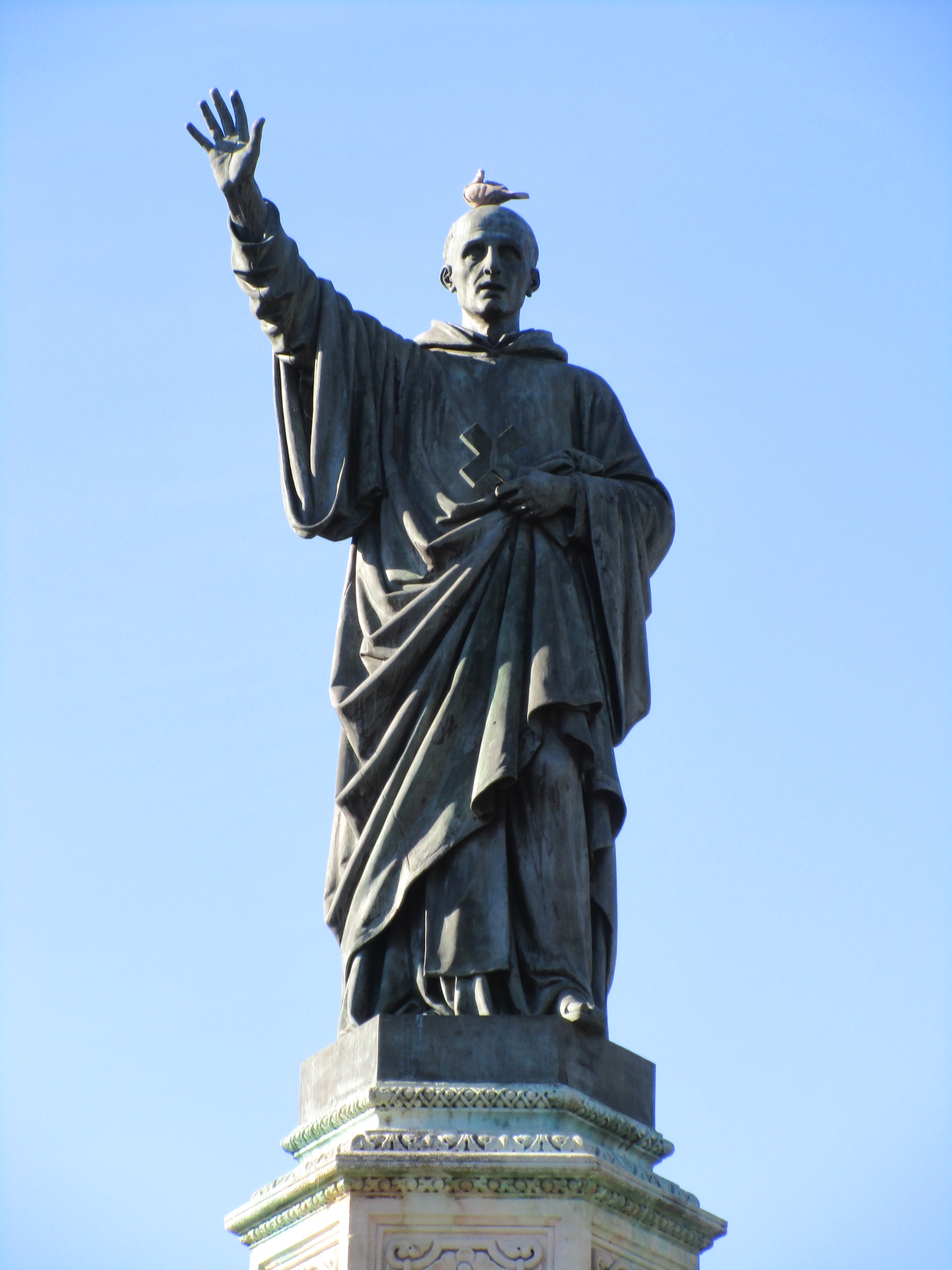

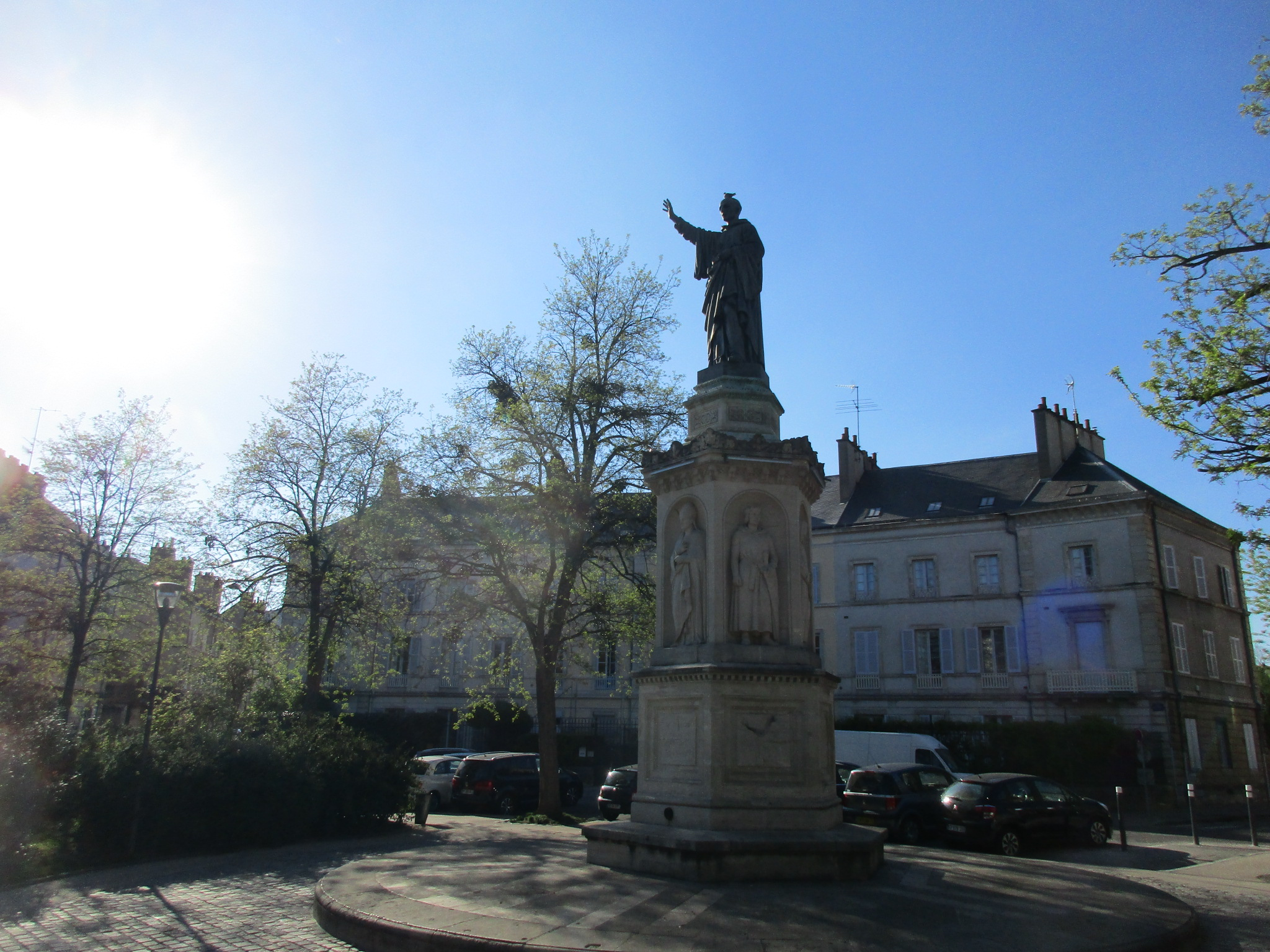

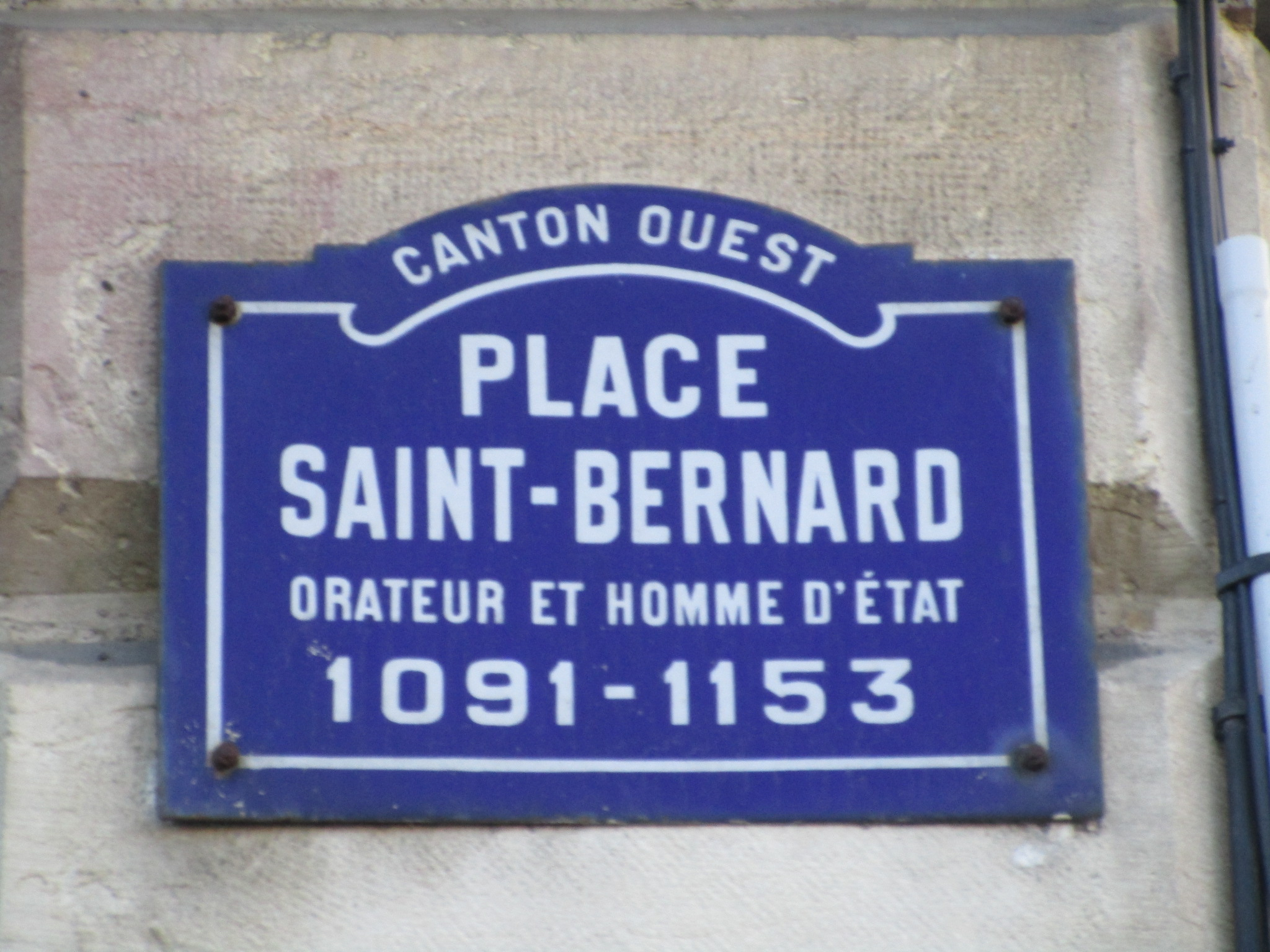

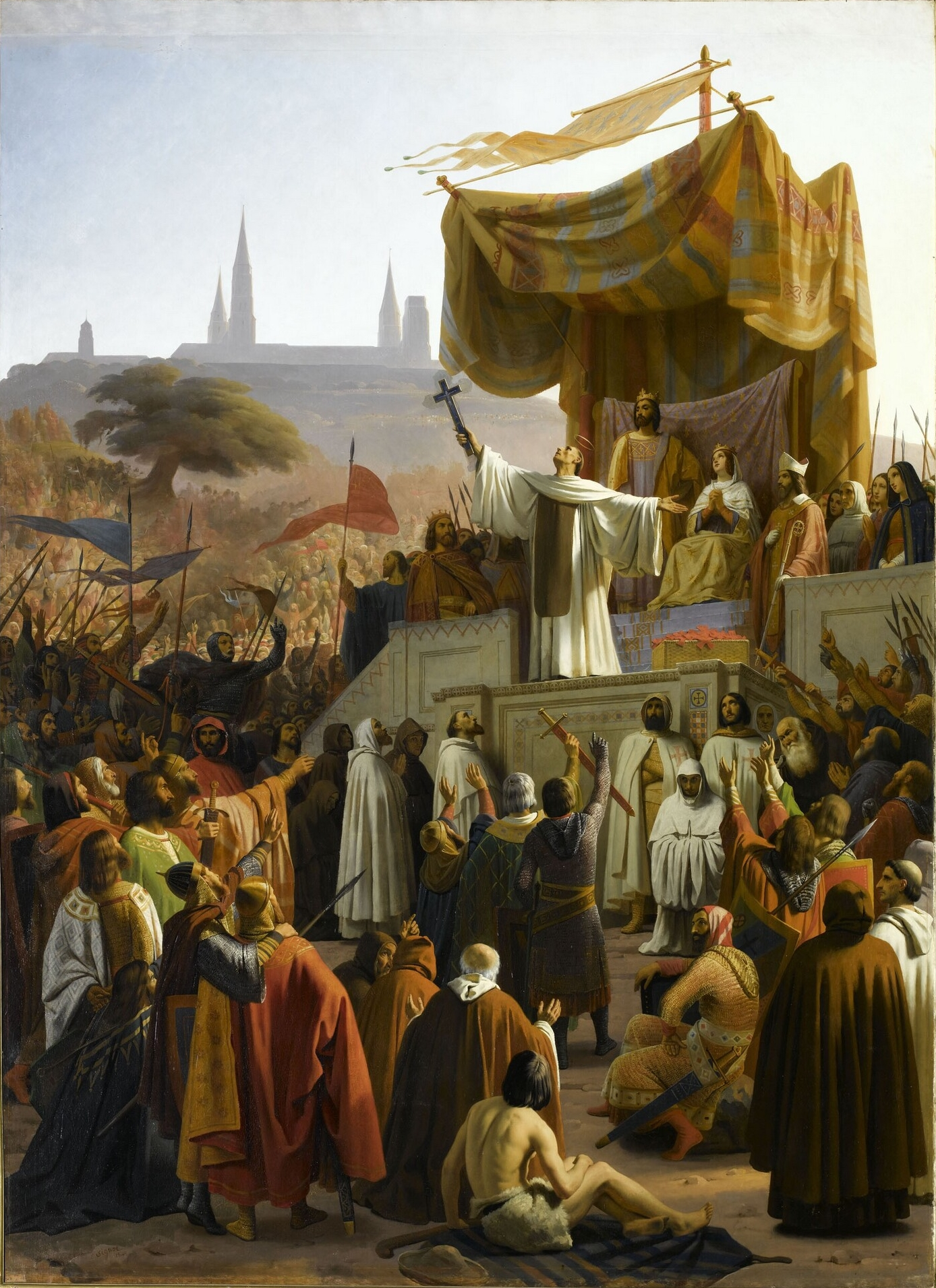

After the 1848 French Revolution, the statue was retired by the municipality and left at the Cathedral of Dijon. It was not re-installed until 1852, at request of the local bishop, with the approval of the municipal council.

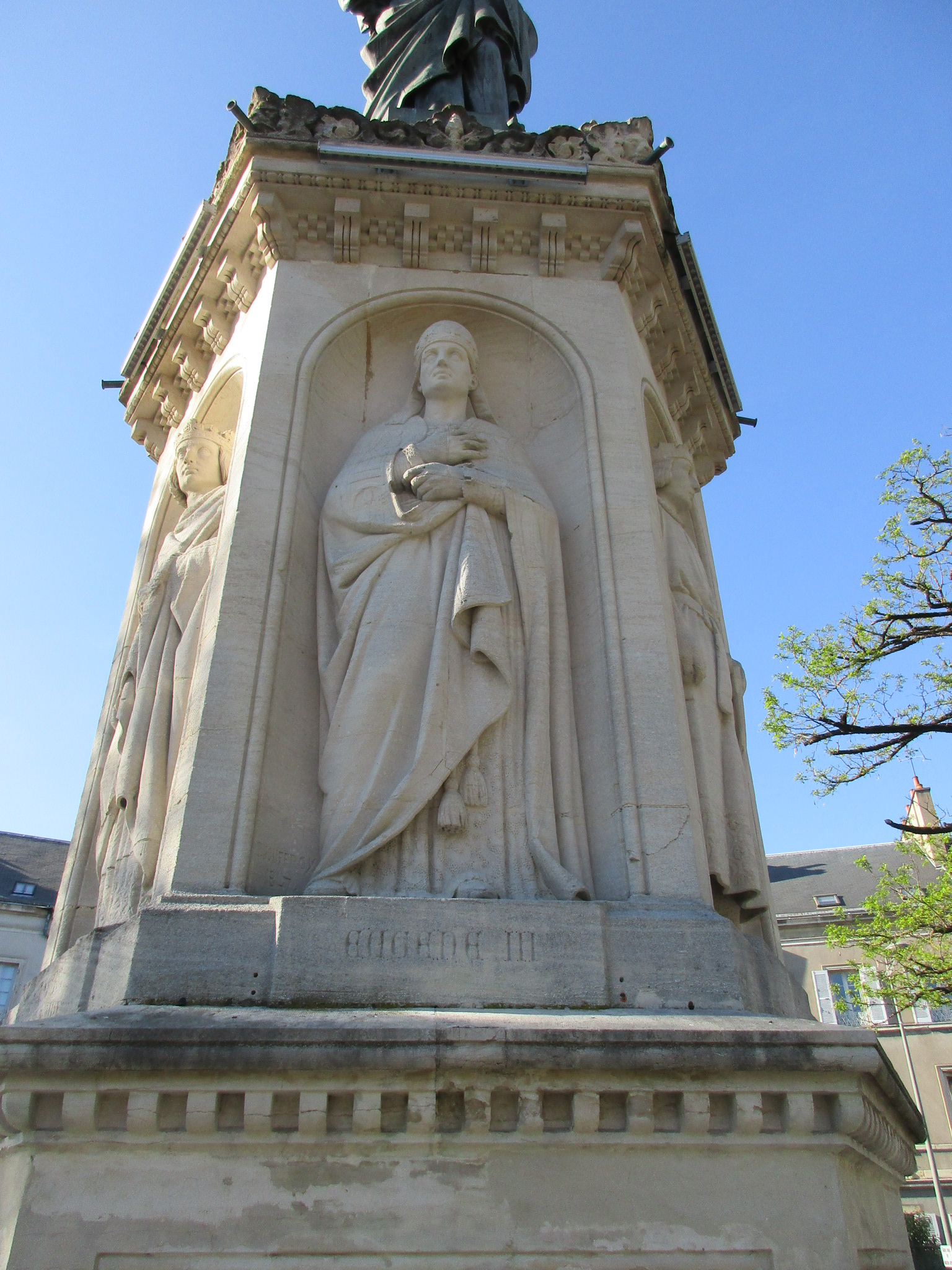
Eugene III

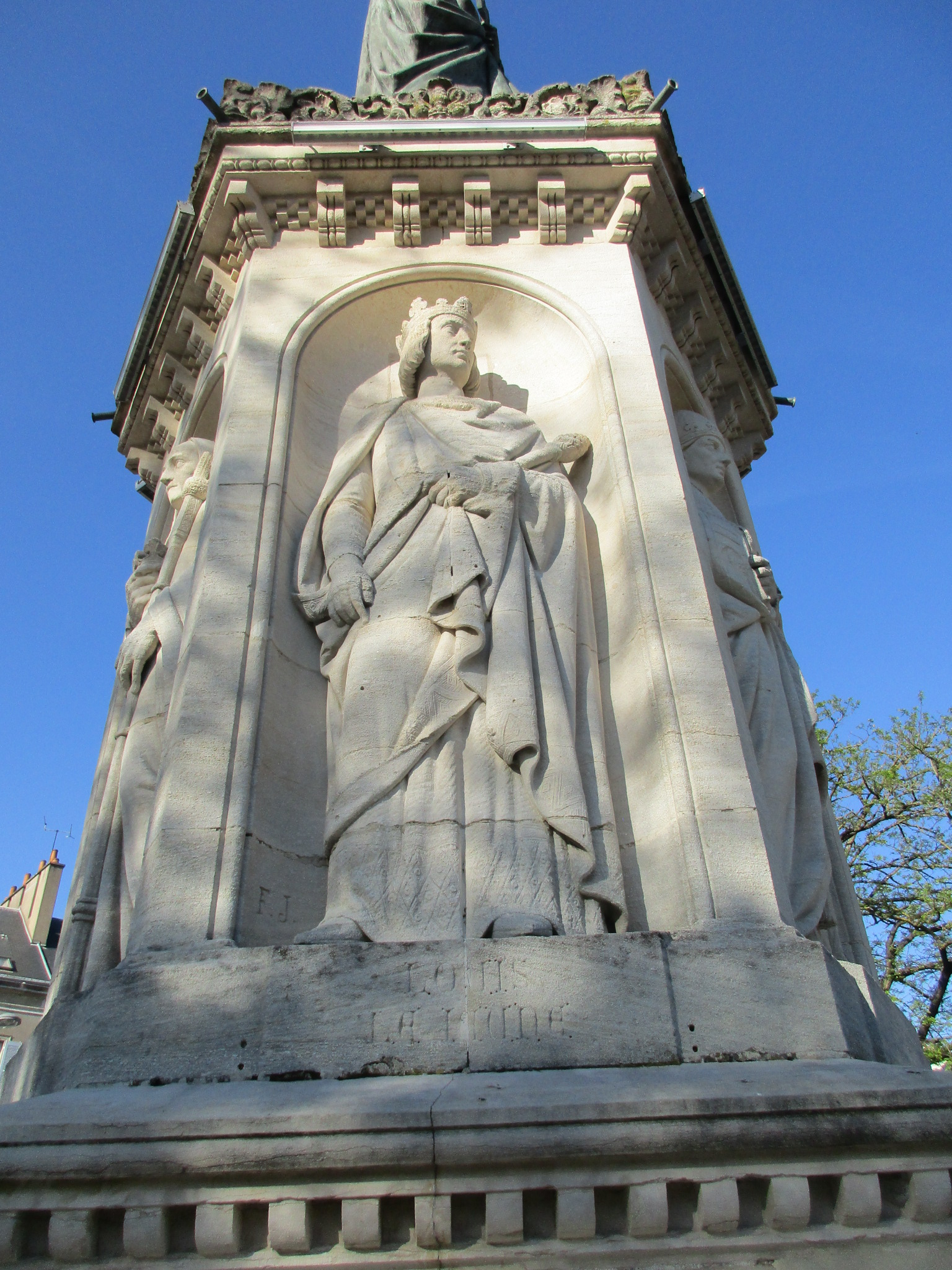
Louis VII

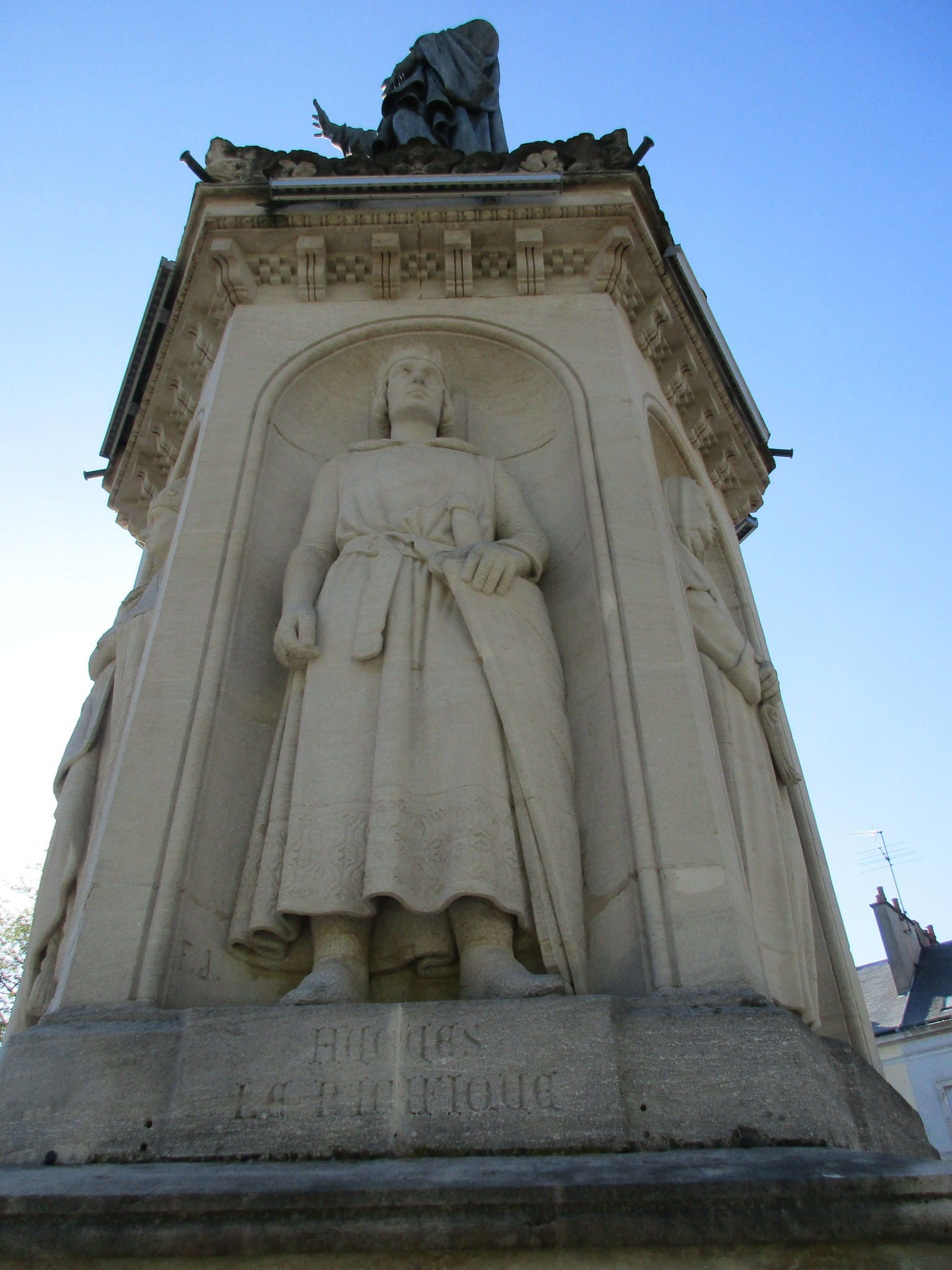
Hugh II of Burgundy

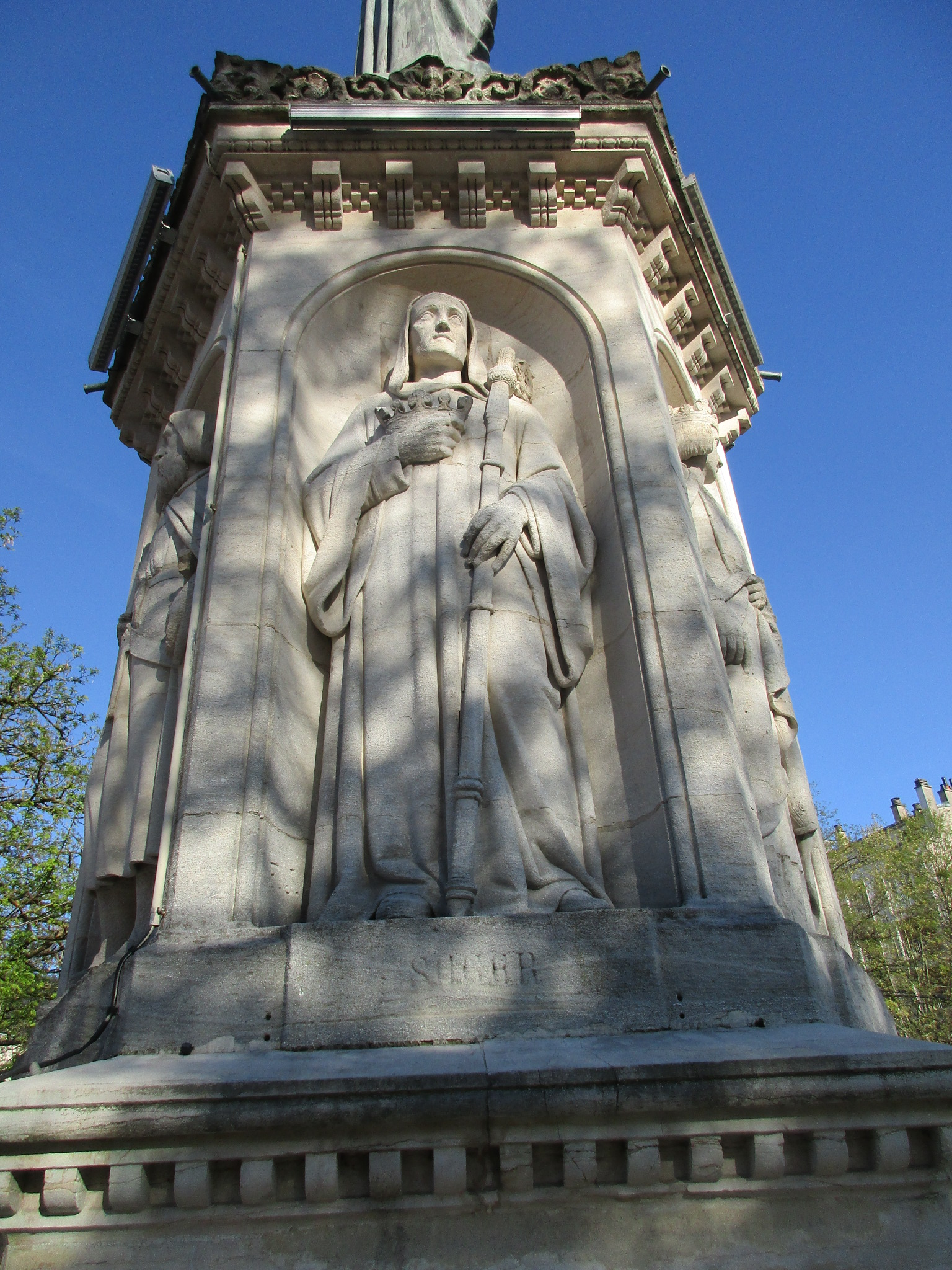
Suger of Saint-Denis

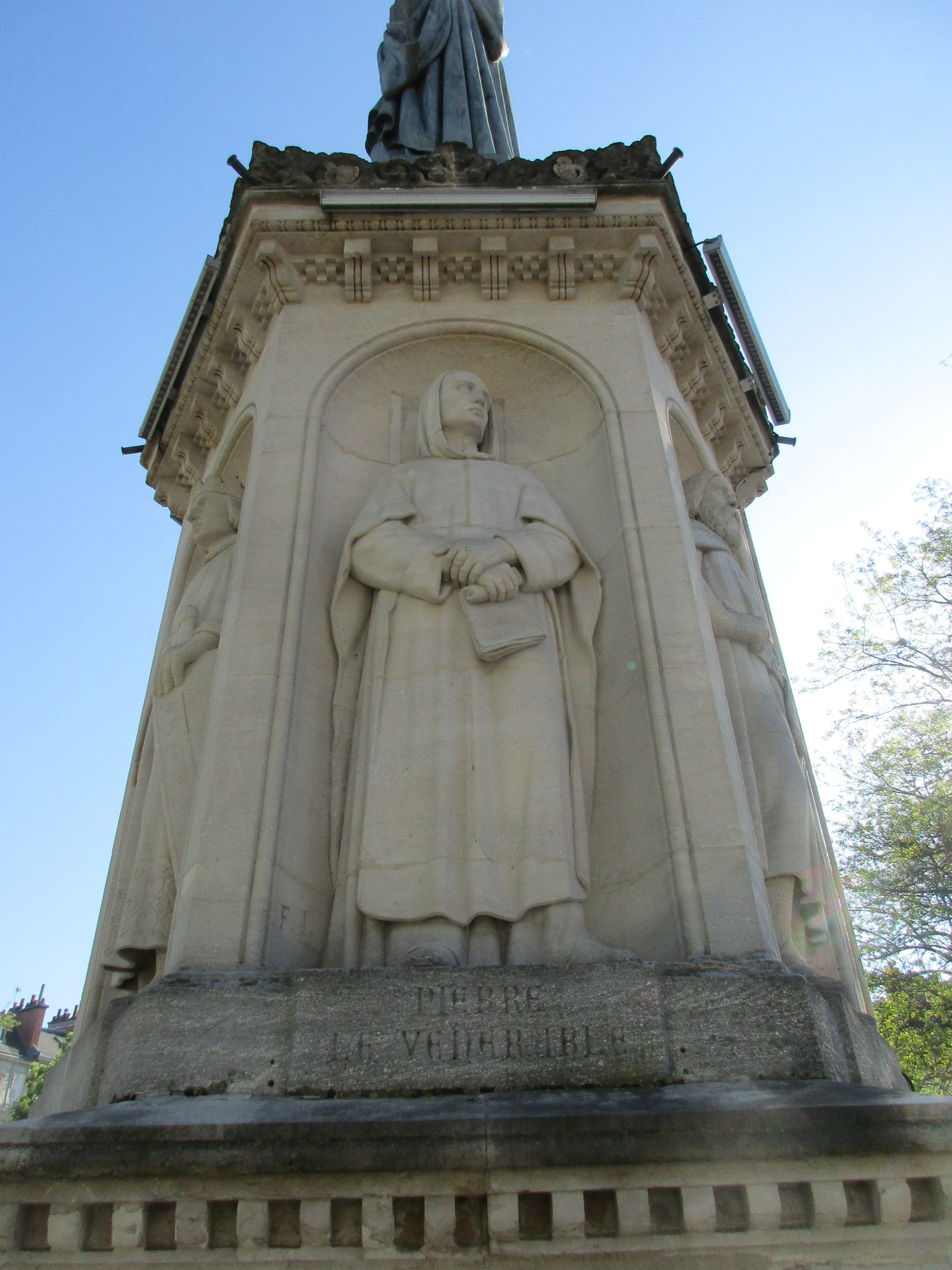
Peter the Venerable

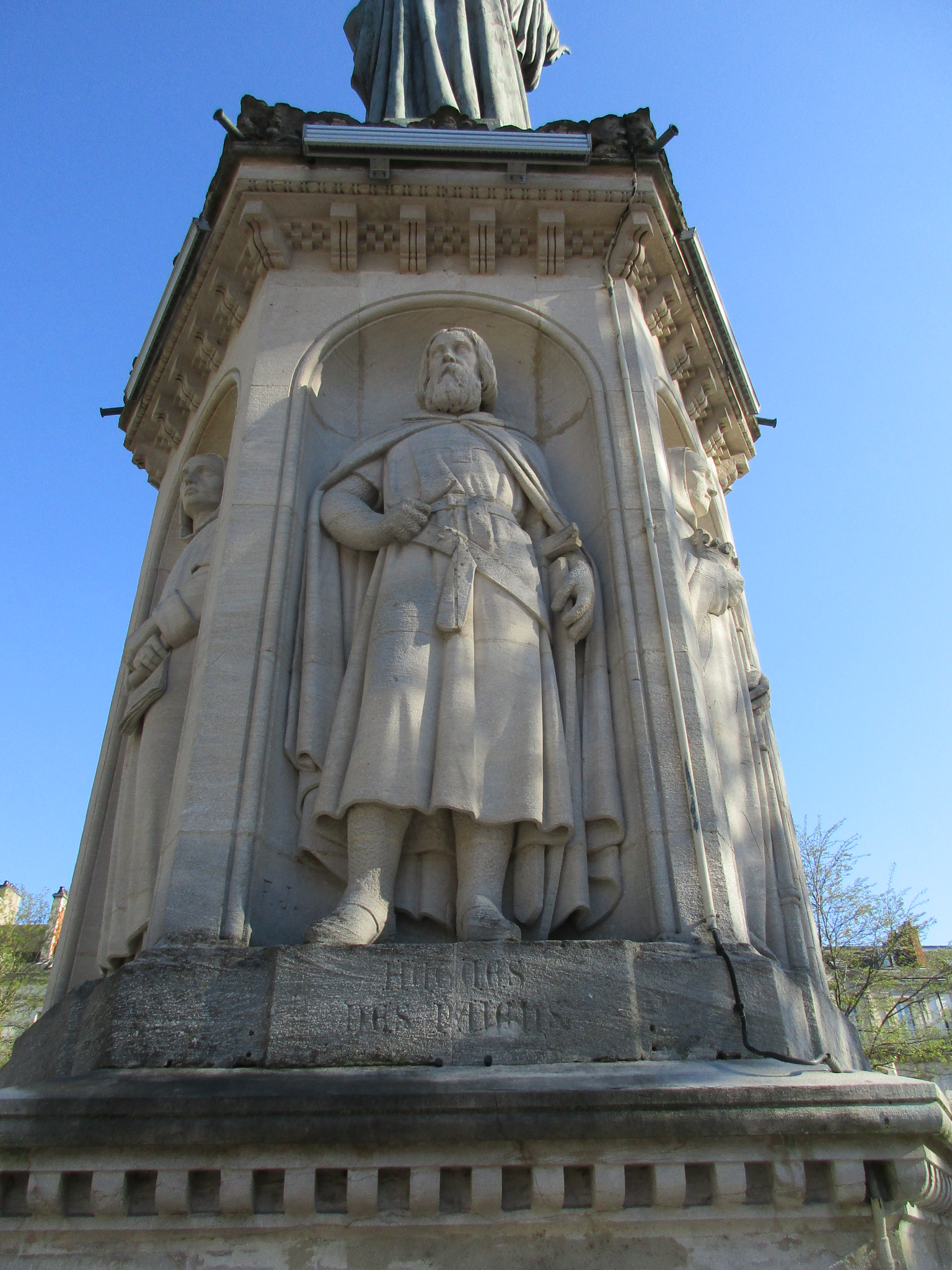
Hugues de Payns

== Description ==
The statue of Bernard of Clairvaux represents him while preaching the Second Crusade in 31 March 1146 before the assembly of the Vézelay Abbey. His left hand holds a Christian cross over his chest. Around the pedestal, five important personalities he influenced are depicted:

- The Pope Eugene III;
- The king of France Louis VII the Young;
- The duke of Burgundy Hugh II;
- Suger of Saint-Denis (abbot of the Basilica of Saint-Denis);
- Peter the Venerable (abbot of the Cluny Abbey);
- Hugues de Payns (founder of the Knights Templar).

=== Inscriptions ===
- base: Fs Jouffroy 1877
- front: A / SAINT BERNARD / NE A FONTAINE-LES-DIJON / EN MXCI
- back: ERIGE PAR SOUSCRIPTION / VII NOV. MDCCCXLVII
