= Alphonse de Lamartine =

French author, poet and statesman (1790–1869)

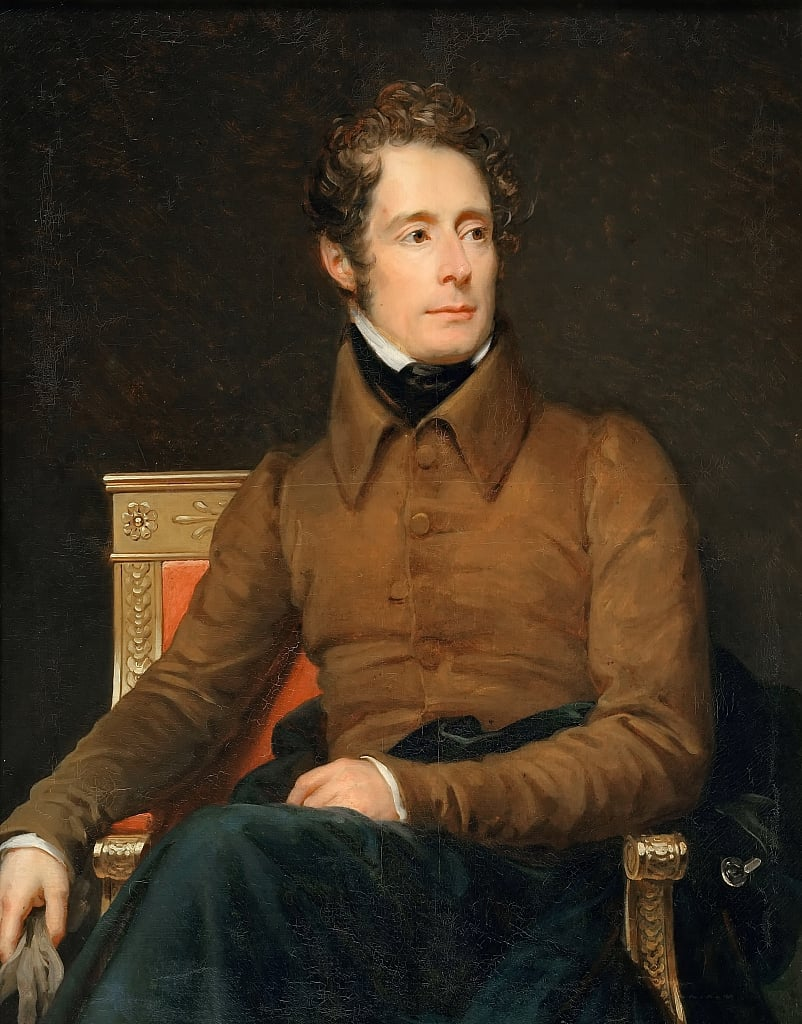
- Portrait of Alphonse de Lamartine by François Gérard, 1831

Member of the National Assembly for Saône-et-Loire
- In office 8 July 1849 – 2 December 1851
- Preceded by: Charles Rolland
- Succeeded by: End of the Second Republic
- Constituency: Mâcon

Minister of Foreign Affairs
- In office 24 February 1848 – 11 May 1848
- Prime Minister: Jacques-Charles Dupont
- Preceded by: François Guizot (also Prime Minister)
- Succeeded by: Jules Bastide

Member of the National Assembly for Bouches-du-Rhône
- In office 4 May 1848 – 26 May 1849
- Preceded by: New constituency
- Succeeded by: Joseph Marcellin Rulhières
- Constituency: Marseille

Member of the Chamber of Deputies for Saône-et-Loire
- In office 4 November 1837 – 24 February 1848
- Preceded by: Claude-Louis Mathieu
- Succeeded by: Charles Rolland
- Constituency: Mâcon

Member of the Chamber of Deputies for Nord
- In office 7 January 1833 – 3 October 1837
- Preceded by: Paul Lemaire
- Succeeded by: Louis de Hau de Staplande
- Constituency: Bergues

Personal details
- Born: Alphonse Marie Louis de Prat de Lamartine; 21 October 1790 Mâcon, Burgundy, Kingdom of France
- Died: 28 February 1869 (aged 78) Paris, French Empire
- Party: Social Party (1833–1837); Third Party (1837–1848); Moderate Republican (1848–1851)
- Spouse: Elisa de Lamartine (m. 1820; died 1863)
- Children: Alphonse de Lamartine (1821–1822); Julia de Lamartine (1822–1832)
- Education: Belley College
- Profession: Writer; Poet
- Writing career
- Years active: 1811–1869
- Period: 19th century
- Genres: Novel; Poetry; History; Theatre; Biography
- Subjects: Nature, love, spiritualism
- Notable work: Graziella (1852)
- Movement: Romanticism

Alphonse Marie Louis de Prat de Lamartine (French: [alfɔ̃s maʁi lwi də pʁa d(ə) lamaʁtin]; 21 October 1790 – 28 February 1869) was a French author, poet, and statesman. Initially a moderate royalist, he became one of the leading critics of the July Monarchy of Louis-Philippe, aligning more with the Republican Left and Social Catholicism.

Lamartine was a leading figure in the 1848 French Revolution and was instrumental in the foundation of the Second Republic along with the preservation of the tricolor as the flag of France. During the revolutionary year of 1848 he served as Foreign Minister and frequently worked to ease tensions between the government and the working class. He was a candidate in the 1848 French presidential election but lost to Louis Napoleon Bonaparte. After the election, he retired from political life.

== Biography ==
=== Early years ===
Born in Mâcon, Burgundy, on 21 October 1790, into a family of the French provincial nobility, Lamartine spent his youth at the family estate. In his youth he read Fénelon, Voltaire, Parny, Bernardin de Saint-Pierre, Racine, Tasso, Dante, Petrarch, Mme de Staël, Shakespeare, Chateaubriand, and Ossian.

In 1820, Lamartine published his first collection of poems, Les Méditations Poétiques, which brought him instant fame. One of the notable poems in this collection was his partly autobiographical poem Le Lac ("The Lake"), which he dedicated to Julie Charles, the wife of a celebrated physician. In it he describes in retrospect the fervent love shared by a couple from the point of view of the bereaved man.

He was made a Chevalier of the Legion of Honour in 1825. He worked for the French embassy in Italy from 1825 to 1828. In 1829, he was elected a member of the Académie française. He was elected as a member of the Chamber of Deputies in 1833. In 1835 he published the Voyage en Orient, an account of the journey he had just made, in royal luxury, to the countries of the Orient, and in the course of which he had lost his only daughter. Lamartine was masterly in his use of French poetic forms but from then on he confined himself to prose. Raised a devout Catholic, Lamartine became a pantheist, writing Jocelyn and La Chute d'un ange and in 1847, Histoire des Girondins, in praise of the Girondists. In his older years Lamartine returned to the Church.

== Political career ==
=== July Monarchy ===
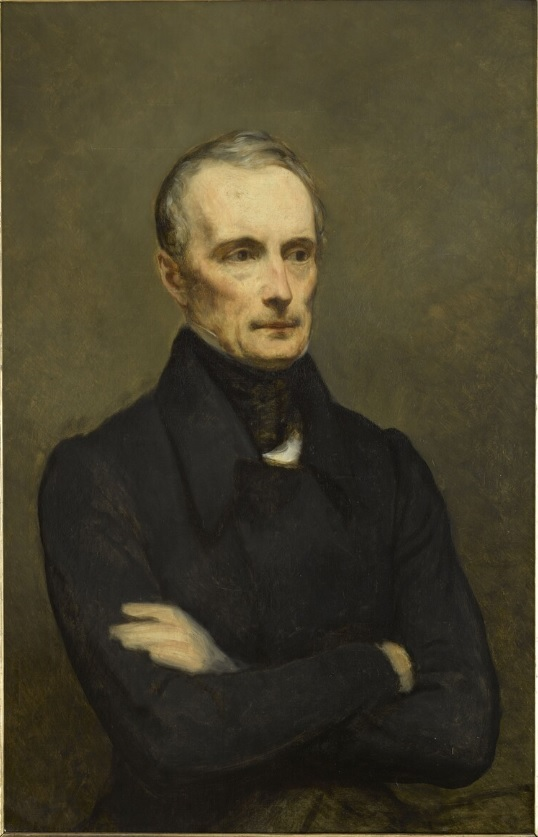
Portrait by Ary Scheffer, 1848

Initially a monarchist, Lamartine came to embrace democratic ideals and opposed militaristic nationalism. Around 1830, Lamartine's views shifted toward liberalism. His first run for Parliament was an unsuccessful attempt in 1831 as a "broad and moderate royalist". When elected in 1833 to the Chamber of Deputies and asked what side of the chamber he was going to sit on, he answered "on the ceiling". During his time in the Chamber, Lamartine always sat in the opposition. He promptly established his own "Social Party", influenced by Saint-Simonian ideas, and gained a reputation as a prominent critic of the July Monarchy. Initially critical of both the Bourgeois Monarchy and of Republican agitators, Lamartine began to lean toward republicanism during the monarchy's final years.

Lamartine denounced the French government's decision to back down during the Oriental Crisis of 1840, forcing France's ally Muhammad Ali to surrender Crete, Syria, and Hejaz to the Ottoman Empire, calling it "the Waterloo of French diplomacy". A follower of Lamennais, Lamartine advocated for the separation of church and state, believing it would enable the church to fulfill its divine mission unencumbered by state affairs or interests. By the end of the 30s the radical opposition considered Lamartine their leading spokesman against King Louis-Phillipe and François Guizot.

Lamartine's Histoire des Girondins was an instant success to the point that he styled himself the "Minister of Public Opinion" and considered one of the causes of the 1848 revolution.

=== Second Republic ===
He was briefly in charge of the government during the turbulence of 1848. He was Minister of Foreign Affairs from 24 February 1848 to 11 May 1848. Due to his advanced age, Jacques-Charles Dupont de l'Eure, Chairman of the Provisional Government, effectively delegated many of his duties to Lamartine. He was then a member of the Executive Commission, the political body which served as France's joint Head of State.

Lamartine was instrumental in the founding of the Second Republic, having met with republican deputies and journalists in the Hôtel de Ville to agree on the makeup of its provisional government. Lamartine himself was chosen to declare the Republic in traditional form in the balcony of the Hôtel de Ville, and ensured the continuation of the Tricolour as the flag of the nation.

On 25 February 1848, Lamartine said about the Tricolour Flag:

"I spoke to you as a citizen earlier, well! Now listen to me, your Foreign Minister. If you take the tricolor flag away from me, know it, you will remove from me half the external force of France! Because Europe only knows the flag of its defeats and of our victories in the flag of the Republic and of the Empire. By seeing the red flag, they will believe that they are only seeing the flag of a party! This is the flag of France, it is the flag of our victorious armies, it is the flag of our triumphs that must be raised before Europe. France and the tricolor are one same thought, one same prestige, one same terror, if necessary, for our enemies! Imagine how much blood would be necessary for you to get another flag renamed! Citizens, for me, the red flag, I will never adopt it, and I am going to tell you why I'm against it with all the strength of my patriotism. It's that the tricolor has toured the world with the Republic and the Empire, with your freedoms and your glories, and the red flag has only toured the Champ-de-Mars, dragged in the blood of the people."

During his term as a politician of the Second Republic, he led efforts that culminated in the abolition of slavery and the death penalty, as well as the enshrinement of the right to work and the short-lived national workshop programs. A political idealist who supported democracy and pacifism, his moderate stance on most issues caused many of his followers to desert him. He was an unsuccessful candidate in the 1848 presidential election, receiving fewer than 19,000 votes and losing to Louis Napoléon Bonaparte. He subsequently retired from politics and dedicated himself to literature.

=== Final years and legacy ===
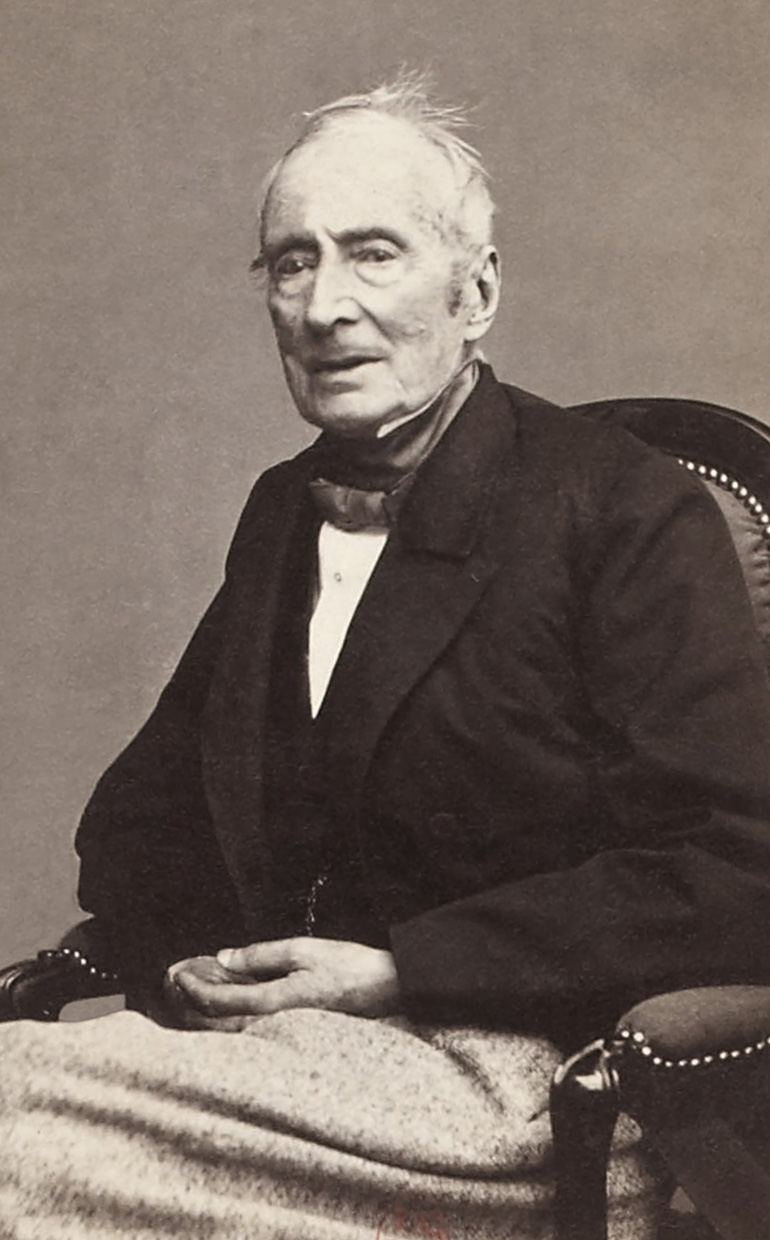
Alphonse de Lamartine photographed in 1865

He published volumes on the most varied subjects (history, criticism, personal confidences, literary conversations) especially during the Empire, when, having retired to private life and having become the prey of his creditors, he condemned himself to what he calls "literary hard-labor to exist and pay his debts". Lamartine ended his life in poverty, publishing monthly installments of the Cours familier de littérature to support himself. He died in Paris in 1869.

Nobel prize winner Frédéric Mistral's fame was in part due to the praise of Alphonse de Lamartine in the fortieth edition of his periodical Cours familier de littérature, following the publication of Mistral's long poem Mirèio. Mistral is the most revered writer in modern Occitan literature.

Lamartine is considered to be the first French romantic poet (though Charles-Julien Lioult de Chênedollé was working on similar innovations at the same time), and was acknowledged by Paul Verlaine and the Symbolists as an important influence. Leo Tolstoy also admired Lamartine, who was the subject of some discourses in his notebooks.

== Other interests ==
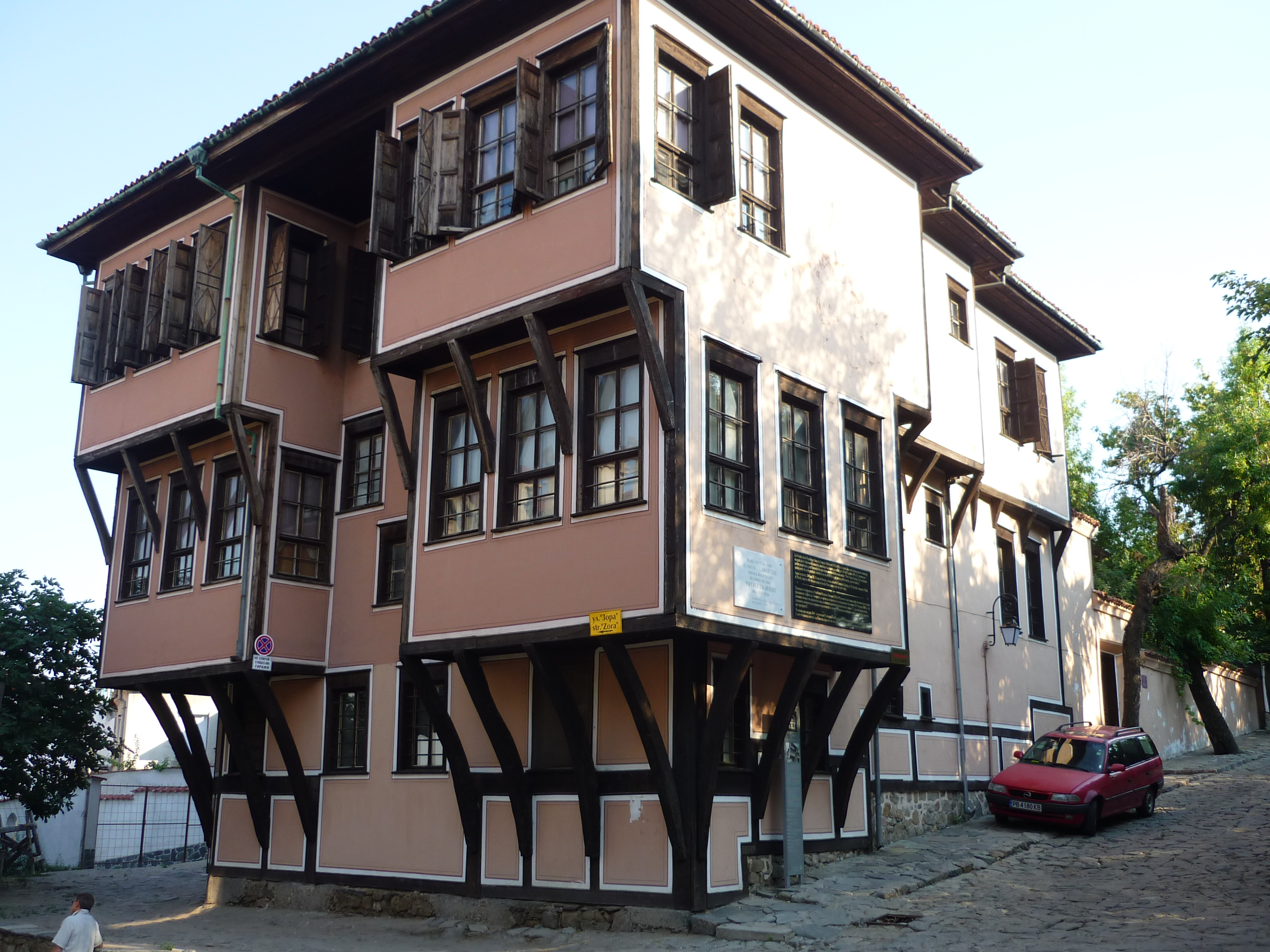
Lamartine's House in Plovdiv, Bulgaria

Alphonse de Lamartine was also an Orientalist. He used themes and materials of the Levant and the Bible to create plotlines, heroes, and landscapes that resemble an exotic Oriental world. He also had a particular interest in Lebanon and the Middle East. He travelled to Lebanon, Syria and the Holy Land in 1832–33. During that trip, while he and his wife, the painter and sculptor Elisa de Lamartine, were in Beirut, on 6 December 1832, their only remaining child, Julia, died at ten years of age. It was, however, considered a journey of recovery and immersion in specific Christian icons, symbols, and terrain with his view that the region could bring about the rebirth of a new Christianity and spirituality that could save Europe from destruction.

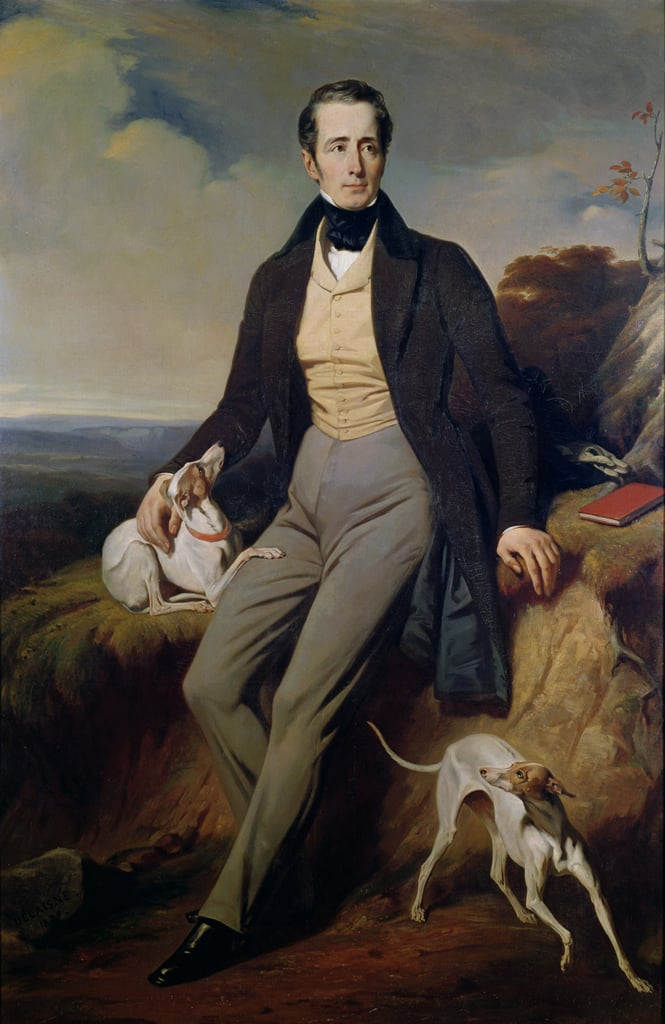
Lamartine in 1839

During his trip to Lebanon he had met prince Bashir Shihab II and prince Simon Karam, who were enthusiasts of poetry. A valley in Lebanon is still called the Valley of Lamartine as a commemoration of that visit, and the Lebanon cedar forest still harbors the "Lamartine Cedar", which was inscribed with his name by Marie-Joseph de Géramb (previously known as Ferdinand de Géramb) in 1832 at the request of Lamartine's daughter, Julia. Lamartine was so influenced by his trip that he staged his 1838 epic poem La Chute d'un ange (The Fall of an Angel) in Lebanon.

Raised by his mother to respect animal life, he found the eating of meat repugnant, saying 'One does not have one heart for Man and one for animals. One has a heart or one does not'. His writings in La chute d'un Ange (1838) and Les confidences (1849) would be taken up by supporters of vegetarianism in the twentieth century.

== Religious belief ==
=== On the spirit of the times ===
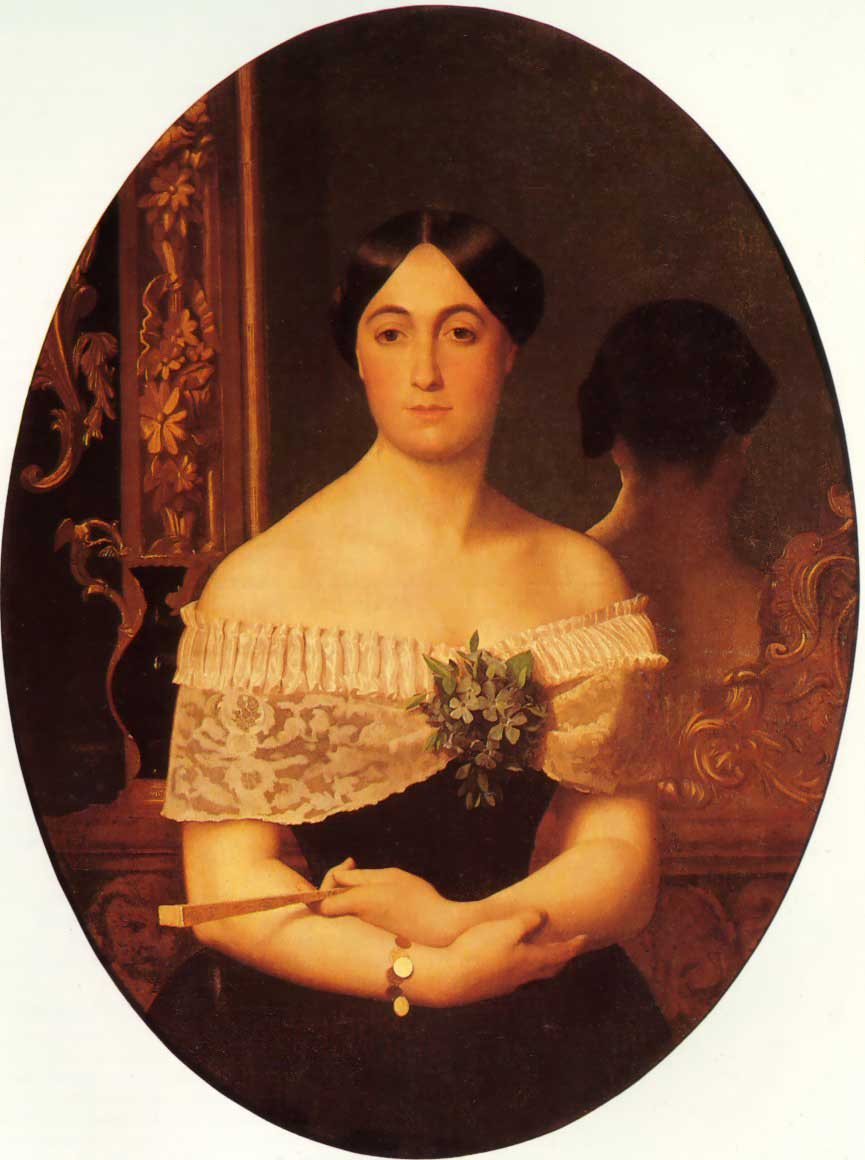
Portrait of Madame de Lamartine by Jean-Léon Gérôme (1849)

Thanks to the increase of general reason, to the light of philosophy, to the inspiration of Christianity, to the progress of the idea of justice, of charity, and of fraternity, in laws, manners, and religion, society in America, in Europe, and in France, especially since the Revolution, has broken down all these barriers, all these denominations of caste, all these injurious distinctions among men. Society is composed only of various conditions, professions, functions, and ways of life, among those who form what we call a Nation; of proprietors of the soil, and proprietors of houses; of investments, of handicrafts, of merchants, of manufacturers, of formers; of day-laborers becoming farmers, manufacturers, merchants, or possessors of houses or capital, in their turn; of the rich, of those in easy circumstances, of the poor, of workmen with their hands, workmen with their minds; of day-laborers, of those in need, of a small number of men enjoying considerable acquired or inherited wealth, of others of a smaller fortune painfully increased and improved, of others with property only sufficient for their needs; there are some, finally, without any personal possession but their hands, and gleaning for themselves and for their families, in the workshop, or the field, and at the threshold of the homes of others on the earth, the asylum, the wages, the bread, the instruction, the tools, the daily pay, all those means of existence which they have neither inherited, saved, nor acquired. These last are what have been improperly called the People.

— Atheism Among the People, by Alphonse de Lamartine (1850), pp. 19–20

=== On Catholic priests ===
Alphonse de Lamartine as quoted in "A Priest" by Robert Nash (1943) on Catholic priests:

"There is a man in every parish, having no family, but belonging to a family is worldwide; who is called in as a witness and adviser in all the important affairs of human life. No one comes into the world or goes out of it without his ministrations. He takes the child from its mother's arms, and parts with him only at the grave. He blesses and consecrates the cradle, the bridal chamber, the bed of death, and the bier. He is one whom innocent children instinctively venerate and reverence, and to whom men of venerable age come to seek for wisdom, and call him father; at whose feet men fall down and lay bare the innermost thoughts of their souls, and weep their most sacred tears. He is one whose mission is to console the afflicted, and soften the pains of body and soul; to whose door come alike the rich and the poor. He belongs to no social class, because he belongs equally to all. He is one, in fine, who knows all, has a right to speak unreservedly, and whose speech, inspired from on high, falls on the minds and hearts of all with the authority of one who is divinely sent, and with the constraining power of one who has an unclouded faith."

== Bibliography ==
- Saül (1818)
- Méditations poétiques (1820)
- Nouvelles Méditations (1823)
- Harmonies poétiques et religieuses (1830)
- Sur la politique rationnelle (1831)
- Voyage en Orient (1835)
- Jocelyn (1836)
- La chute d'un ange (1838)
- Recueillements poétiques (1839)
- Histoire des Girondins (1847)
- Histoire de la Révolution (1849)
- Histoire de la Russie (1849)
- Raphaël (1849)
- Confidences (1849)
- Toussaint Louverture (1850)
- Geneviève, histoire d'une servante (1851)
- Graziella (1852)
- Héloïse et Abélard (1853)
- Les visions (1853)
- Histoire de la Turquie (1854)
- Cours familier de littérature (1856)

== See also ==
- French demonstration of 15 May 1848
- Lamartine Place Historic District in Manhattan, New York City
- Lamartine, Wisconsin

Political offices
Preceded by Jacques-Charles Dupont de l'Eure; Chairman of the Provisional Government of the French Republic	Head of State of France; 6 May – 28 June 1848; Member of the Executive Commission along with: François Arago; Louis-Antoine Garnier-Pagès; Alexandre Ledru-Rollin; Pierre Marie (de Saint-Georges)	Succeeded by Louis-Eugène Cavaignac; President of the Council of Ministers
