= François Jouffroy =

French sculptor (1806–1882)

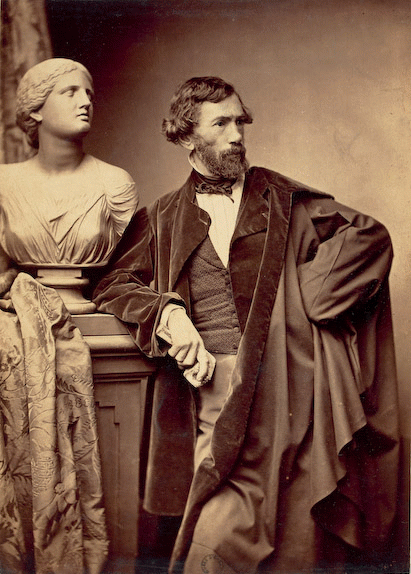
- Jouffroy in 1865 (photograph by Antoine Samuel Adam-Salomon)
- Born: 1 February 1806; Dijon, First French Empire
- Died: 25 June 1882 (aged 76); Laval, Mayenne, French Third Republic
- Occupation: Sculptor

François Jouffroy (French pronunciation: [fʁɑ̃swa ʒufʁwa]; 1 February 1806 – 25 June 1882) was a French sculptor.

== Biography ==
Jouffroy was born in Dijon, France, the son of a baker, and attended the local drawing school before being admitted to the École des Beaux-Arts in Paris in 1824. In 1832 he won the Prix de Rome. Jouffroy often had to compete with Pierre-Jean David d'Angers for public commissions, but during the Second Empire (1851–1870) he still participated in the decoration of several public buildings.

He was a professor at the École des Beaux-Arts from 1865 until his death. Among his students were Per Hasselberg, Jean Dampt, Léopold Morice, Augustus Saint-Gaudens, José Simões de Almeida (Tio), António Soares dos Reis, Elisa de Lamartine, and Adrien Étienne Gaudez. Jouffroy died at Laval, Mayenne in 1882.

== Works ==
Name	Location	Date	Notes
"La Mort d'Orion"	Whereabouts not known	1826	With this work Jouffroy won second prize in the 1826 Prix de Rome competition. He had entered the l'École des Beaux-arts in 1824.
"Un Jeune pâtre napolitain pleurant sur son Tombeau"	Whereabouts not known	1835	This was Jouffroy's first submission to the Paris Salon.
A holy water font in Trinitarian marble	Saint-Germain l'Auxerrois	1844	Jouffroy created a marble font for this church based on drawing by his student Elisa de Lamartine. This piece was also cast in bronze by Barbedienne.
Bust of Lamartine	Musée Lamartine in Mâcon	1843	A bust of Lamartine can be seen in this museum.
Marie Leszczynska	Versailles, châteaux de Versailles et de Trianon	1844	Bust of ex Queen of France.
Jean-Baptiste de Santeuil	Versailles, châteaux de Versailles et de Trianon		Bust of the French writer.
Charles-Paris d'Orléans-Longueville	Versailles, Châteaux de Versailles et de Trianon	1838	A bust of the Duke of Longueville
Pierre-Claude Berrier du Metz	Versailles, châteaux de Versailles et de Trianon	1838	This bust is in plaster.
Monument to Bernard of Clairvaux (Dijon)	Dijon	1844	Statue stands in La place Saint-Bernard in Dijon
"Le Prince de Joinville remettant le cercueil de l'empereur à Louis-Philippe"	Invalides - Napoleon's tomb	1851	One of two white marble bas-reliefs in the crypt of Les Invalides. One descends to the crypt through an imposing bronze door which leads to a staircase. On this door are inscribed an extract from Napoleon's will "Je désire que mes cendres reposent sur les bords de la Seine, au milieu de ce peuple français que j'ai tant aimé" At the bottom of this staircase are Jouffroy's bas-reliefs. Jouffroy depicts the Prince of Joinville delivering Napoleon's coffin to Louis-Philippe. Napoleon had died on 5 May 1821 on the island of St. Helena, where he had been in exile since 1815. He was buried on the island and his remains stayed there until 1840 when Louis-Philippe decided to have the body brought back to France. A body of French sailors, under the command of the Prince of Joinville, brought his coffin to France aboard the ship "Belle Poule". This episode is known as the Retour des cendres.
Les quatre Evangélistes	Paris, Église de Sainte Clotilde.	1851	Jouffroy executed depictions of the four evangelists for the church's altar.
The works Marine Guerrière, Marine marchande and others.	Palais du Louvre, Guichets Lesdiguières	See note	In the Aile Lescot of the Cour Carree is the work "La Sculpture", in the guichets Lesdiguières are the "Marine Guerrière" and "Marine marchande" of 1868, the 1867 statue "Massillon" is located in the Aile Henri 1V, "L'Art et La Science" of 1857 is in the Pavillon Mollien, two caryatides are also in the Pavillon Mollien dating to 1857 and Saint Bernard in the Aile Colbert.
Saint Charles de Borromée	Paris, Église de la Madeleine		Charles de Borromée is depicted holding a large cross. See page 116 in link/reference.
"Le Prince de Joinville assistant à l'exhumation du corps de l'empereur à Sainte-Hélène"	Invalides - Napoleon's tomb	1851	In this marble bas-relief Jouffroy depicts the exhumation of Napoleon's body on St Helena. Again see Retour des cendres
The allegories "La Protection" and "Le Châtiment"	Palais de Justice. Paris	1859	These two statues are on the west façade of the Palais de Justice in the rue d'Harlay
Le Christ et les douze apôtres	Église de Saint-Augustin, Paris	1862	Above the church porch is a large frieze which contains Jouffroy's bas-relief depicting Christ and the apostles.
Achille Leclère	Thionville; Tribunal de grande Instance	1872	Achille François René Leclère was a French architect of distinction.
"Ariane abandonnée"	Tarbes, Musée Massey	1853	Jouffroy depicts Ariadne who had been abandoned by Theseus on Naxos where she was found by Dionysus whom she married
"Erigone"'	Dijon, Musée des Beaux-Arts	1841	Submitted to Paris Salon of 1850
Source-Seine			Jouffroy executed a sculpture of the Celtic water goddess Sequana. It was used by the architects Gabriel Davioud, Victor Baltard et Combaz as part of a grotto called the "nymphée" which marked one of the Seine's sources
"La Désillusion"	Dijon, Musée des Beaux-Arts	1841	A composition in marble submitted to the Paris Salon of 1841
Gaspard Monge	Beaune Museum of Fine Arts	1839	Gaspard Monge, the Comte de Péluse was a French mathematician and inventor of descriptive geometry (the mathematical basis of technical drawing), and the father of differential geometry. During the French Revolution he served as the Minister of the Marine, and was involved in the reform of the French educational system, helping to found the École Polytechnique. Although kept in Beaune the bust is the property of the Musée de Dijon who hold many Jouffroy works including his busts of Bonaparte and Louis Dietsch.
"Capanée foudroyé sous les murs de Thebes"	Paris; École nationale supérieure des Beaux-Arts	1832	This was Jouffroy's winning piece for the 1832 Prix de Rome. The composition was in ronde bosse and in plaster. The composition depicts Capaneus striking the wall during the war of the Seven against Thebes, when he shouted that Zeus himself could not stop him from invading it
"Cain après la malédiction"	Musee Chateau Compiegne	1838	This was Jouffrey's presentation at the Paris Salon of 1838. A distraught Cain is overcome with grief after he had killed his brother.
"Premier secret confié à Vénus" or "Jeune fille confiant son secret à Vénus"	Paris; musée du Louvre département des Sculptures	1839	One of Jouffroy's best known pieces. This marble composition was acquired in 1840 by the Ministère de la Maison du roi for the Musée du Luxembourg. A plaster version is held by the Musée de Toulon and Jouffroy gave the Musée de Dijon a reduced plaster version. The plaster cast is held by the Musee Croatzier in Le Puy-en-Velay. The marble version was shown at the Paris Salon of 1839 and the 1855 Éxposition Universelle. A plaster statuette is held by the Musée de Grenoble acquired in 1874.
"Académie d'homme"	Douai; Musée de la Chartreuse		A high-relief in plaster.
Bust of Béat-Jacques de La Tour-Châtillon	Château de Versailles	1840	A work in plaster. Can be seen in the château's galerie des batailles.
Ferdinand de Marsin	Galerie des Batailles	1842	Bust in plaster
Bust of Antoine François Eugène Merlin	Douai; Musée de la Chartreuse	1844	Merlin took part in the battle of Talavera while commanding the cavalry of the IV Corps d'Armées.
Institute des jeunes aveugles	Paris	1843	Jouffrey executed a statue of Valentin Haüy for the front of the institute's building at 56, boulevard des Invalides, Paris 7e. In his composition Jouffrey depicts Haüy getting inspiration from an allegory of Charity and instructing the blind.
Hôtel de Saint-Seine	Dijon	1844	This building is located in 29 rue Verrerie. In 1844 Jouffrey was commissioned to execute some sculptural work for the wall of the first floor landing.
Bust of Guillaume Dode de la Brunerie	Grenoble; Musée de Grenoble	1849	Plaster bust of one of France's marshals.
Statue of Napoleon when Lieutenant Bonaparte	Auxonne	1857	Apart from the statue Jouffrey also executed a bas-relief for the pedestal. The monument celebrates Napoleon's time in Auxonne as a young officer.
"Les Arts et les Sciences"- Decoration for the Palais du Louvre.	Paris	1855-1957	This work is located on the front of the pavillon Mollien. The musee d'Orsay hold the original plaster model. Jouffrey also completed two caryatides for the pavillon Mollien.
Massillon	Palais du Louvre.Paris	1855-1957	Jouffrey also completed this statue for the Louvre's Henri IV wing. His "Saint Bernard" was part of the exterior decoration of the Colbert wing
Statues representing the cities of Warsaw and Brussels on the facade of the Gare du Nord	Paris	1863	Two of several statues decorating the facade of this main Paris station.
"L'Harmonie"	Paris; Musée d'Orsay	1865	The museum hold a plaster maquette of the sculpture which can be seen on the left hand facade of the Paris Opera House. The architect Charles Garnier commissioned four sculptural groups for the Opéra de Paris façade and apart from "L'Harmonie", other sculptors added the works "La Musique", "Le Drame" and "La Danse".
Napoléon Bonaparte	Auxonne; Musée Bonaparte	1857	Plaster maquette for the statue of Napoleon erected in 1857 in Auxonne's Place d'Armes.
"L'Aurore"	Paris	1870	Jouffroy's L'Aurore (The Dawn) can be seen in the Jardin Marco Polo, one of two parks created in 1867 between the Jardin du Luxembourg and the Observatoire de Paris.
Saint Bernard de Clairvaux	Cathédrale Saint-Vaast Arras	1877	Jouffrey submitted this work in white marble to the 1877 Paris Salon and it was purchased by the French State for Paris' Église Sainte-Geneviève (The Panthéon). It was moved to Arras in 1934.
Bust of Henry Darcy	Dijon, Jardin Darcy	1858	Mounted at top of the Chateau d’Eau, Jardin Darcy, Dijon. A plaster version is on display at Château de Bourbilly, Vic-de-Chassenay

== Gallery of images ==
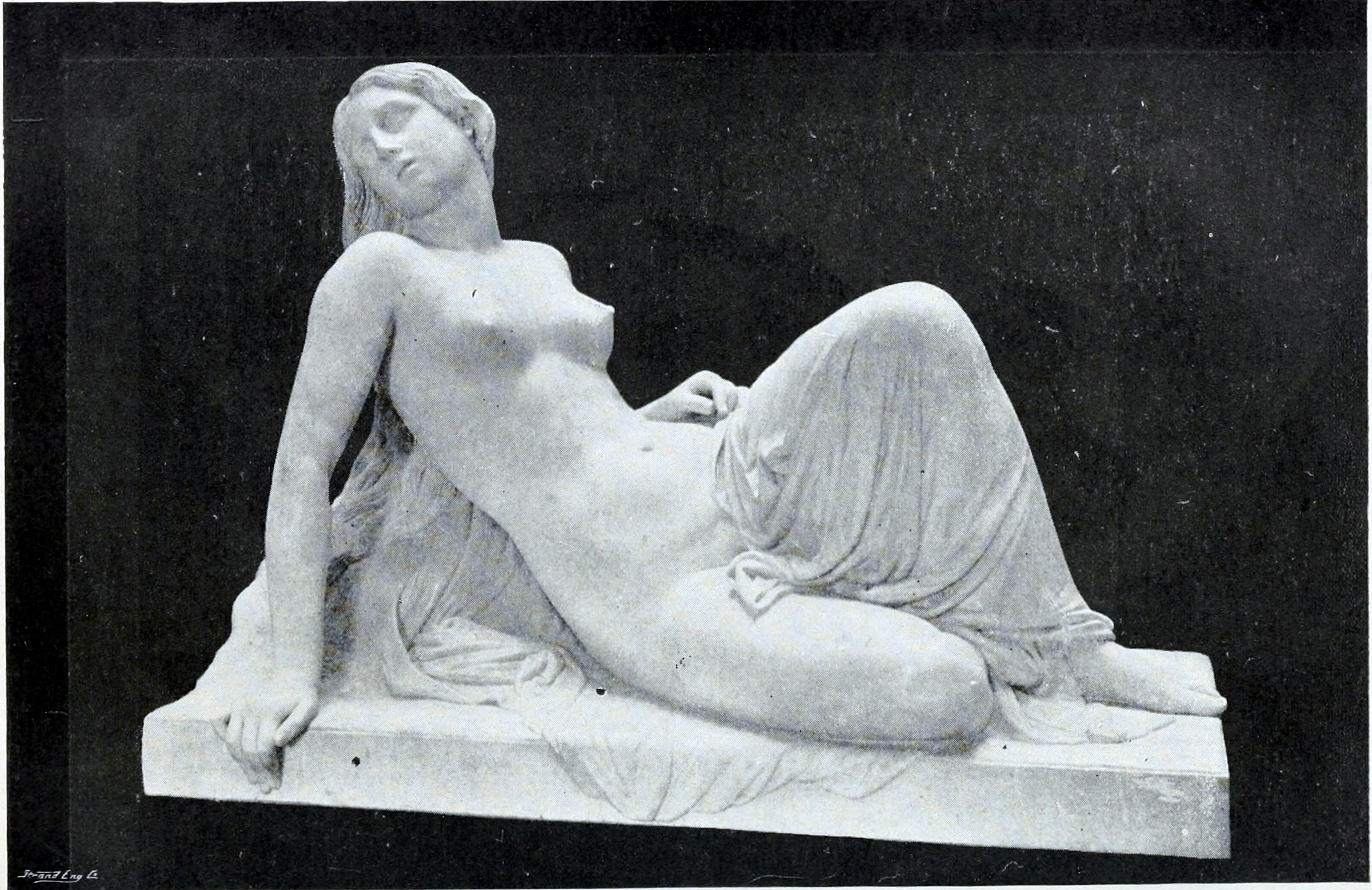
Ariane abandonnée par Thésée dans l'île de Naxos (Ariadne Abandoned by Theseus on the Island of Naxos), 1853.

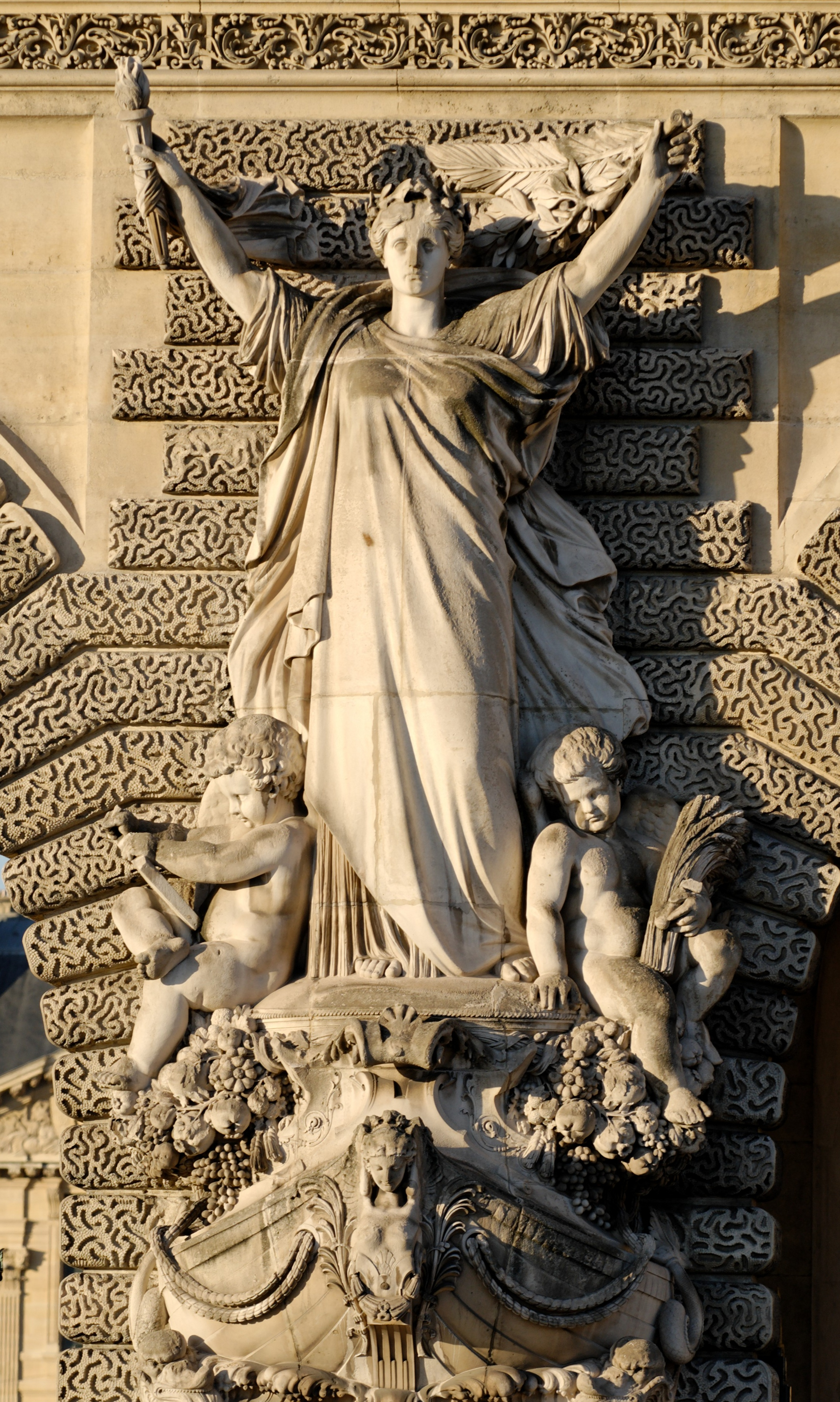
La marine marchande (The Merchant Marine), 1868.

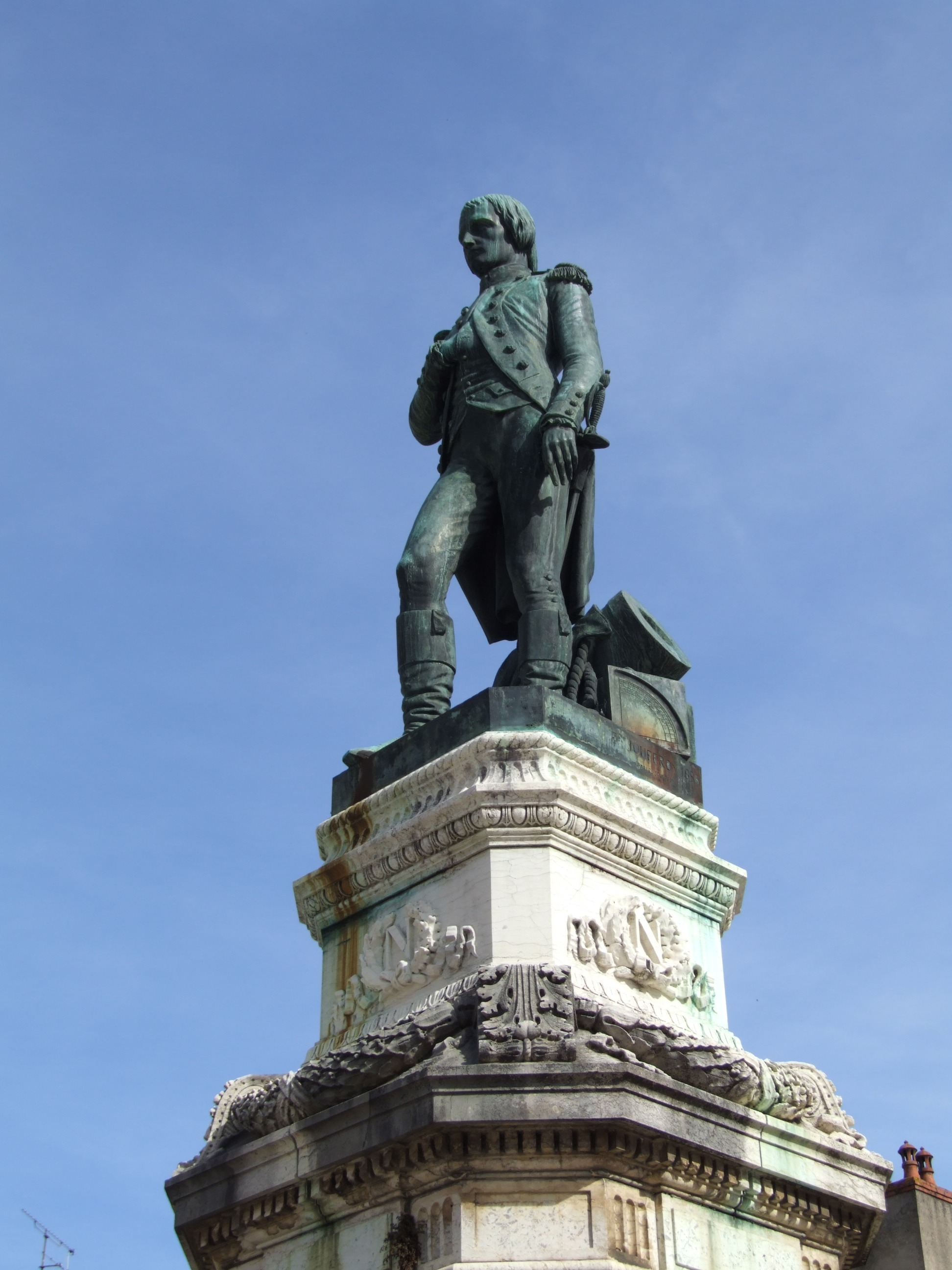
Le Lieutenant Bonaparte (Lieutenant Bonaparte), 1857.

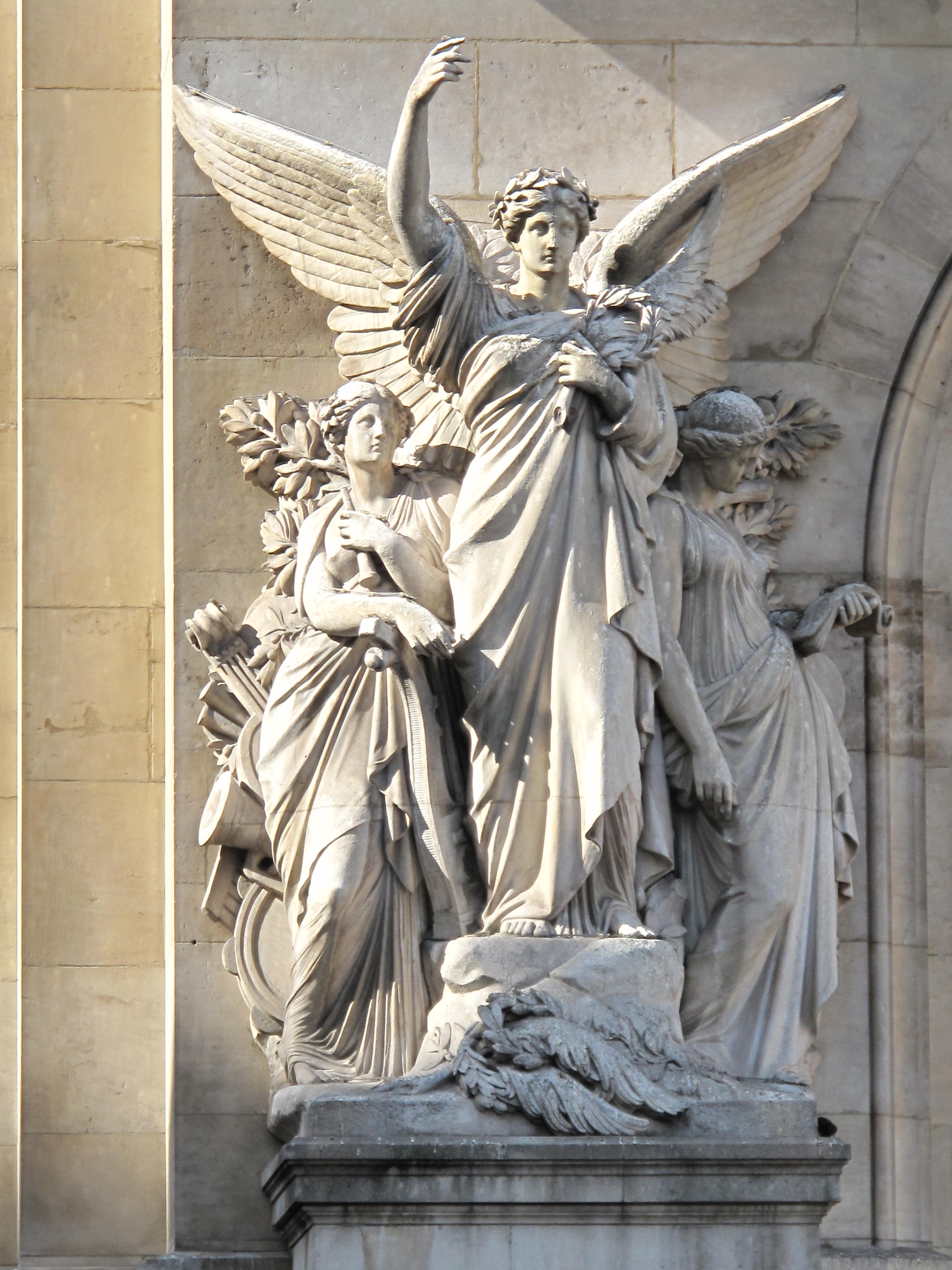
La poésie (Poetry, front), 1865.

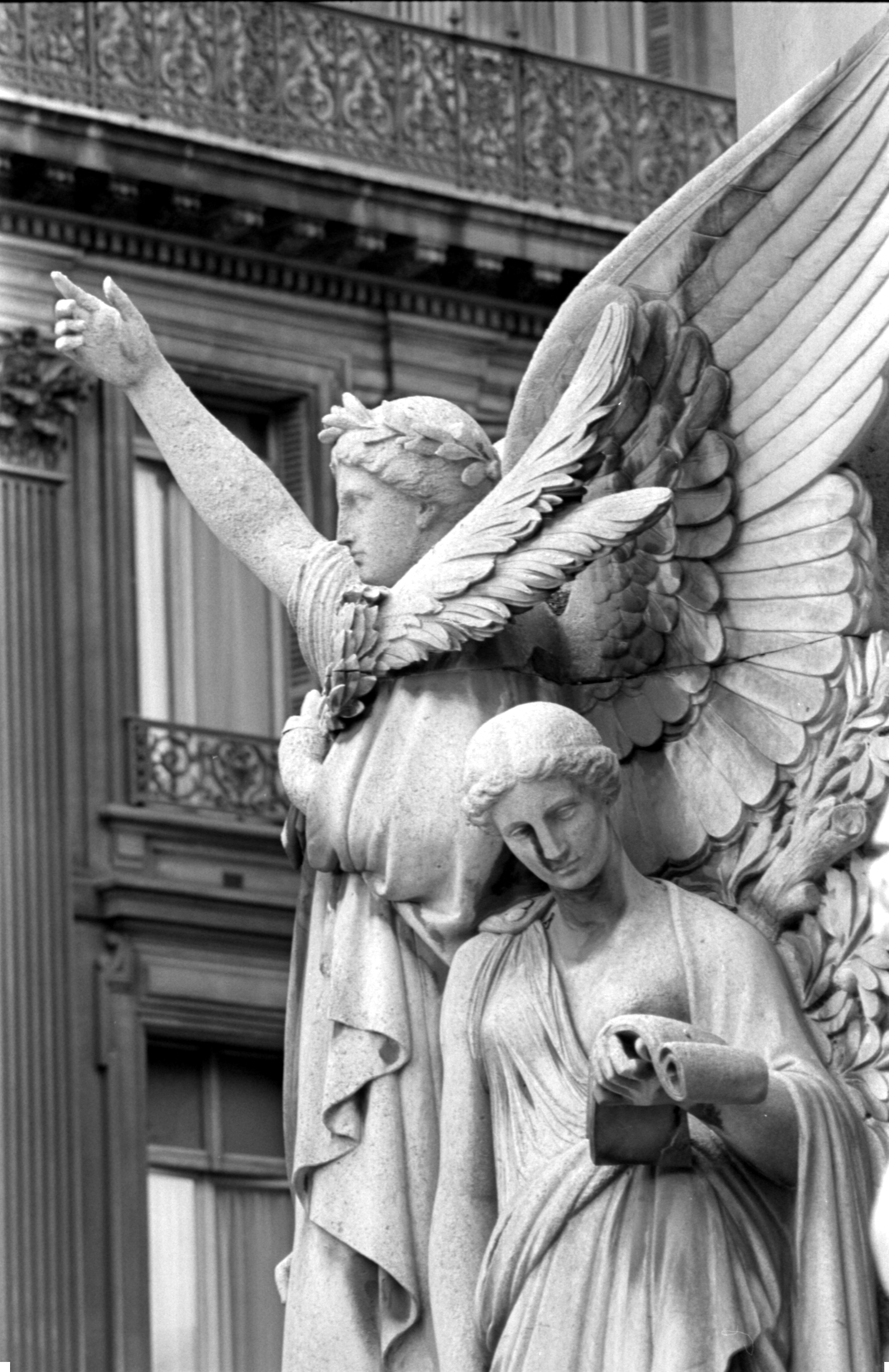
La poésie (Poetry, side), 1865.

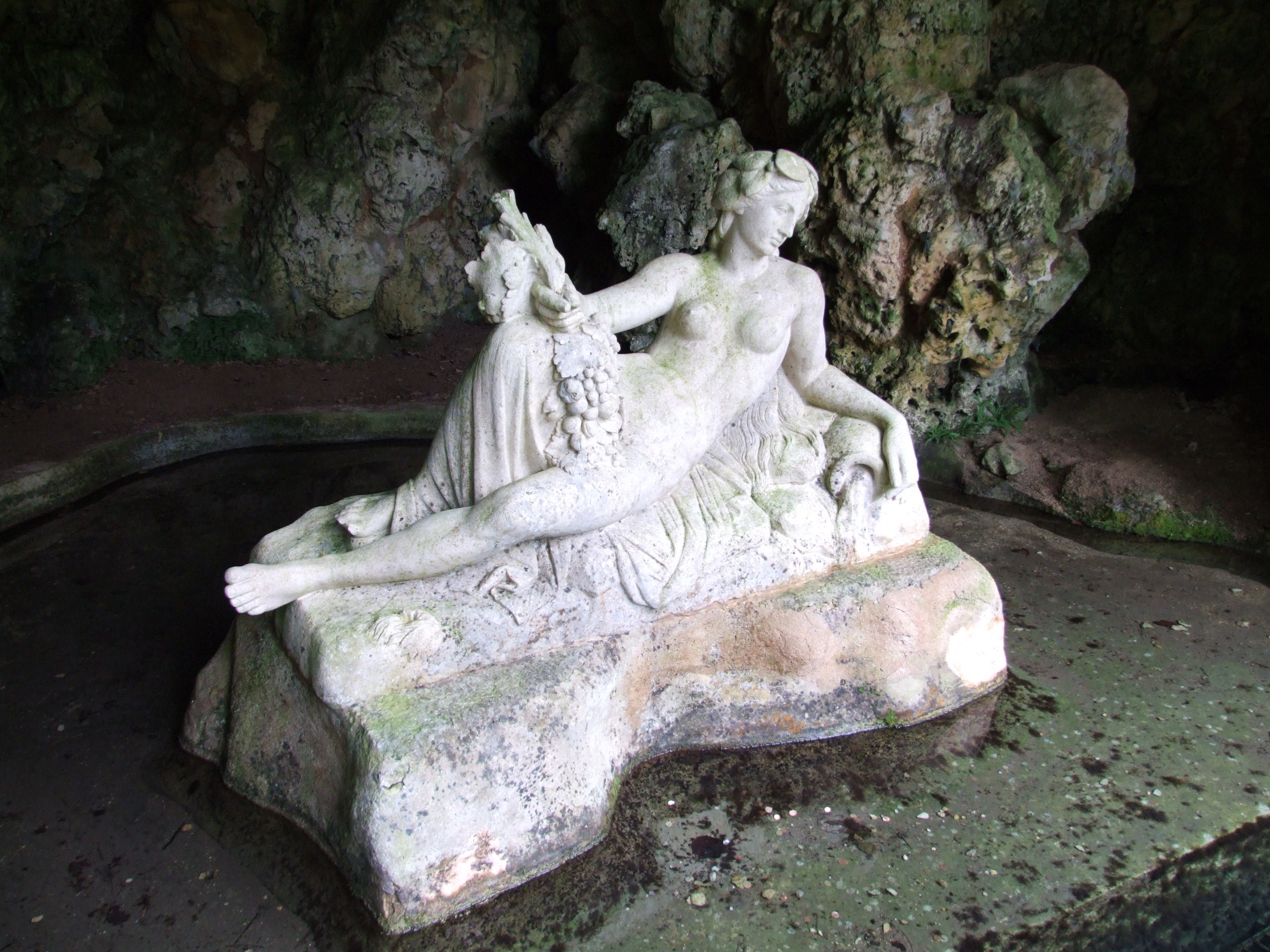
Nymphe des sources de la Seine (The Nymph of the Sources of the Seine), a 1934 copy of the 1867 original.

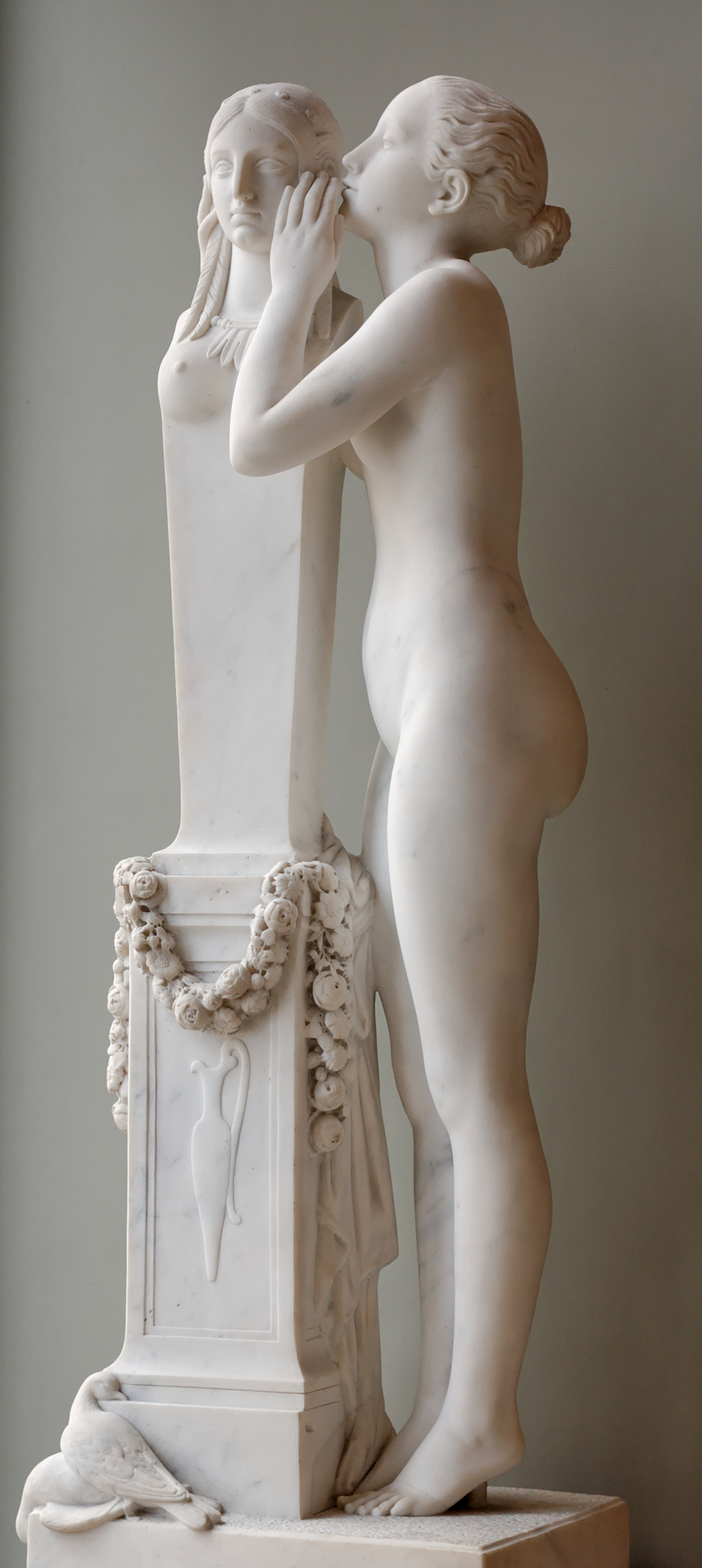
Premier secret confié à Vénus (The First Secret Confided to Venus), 1839.

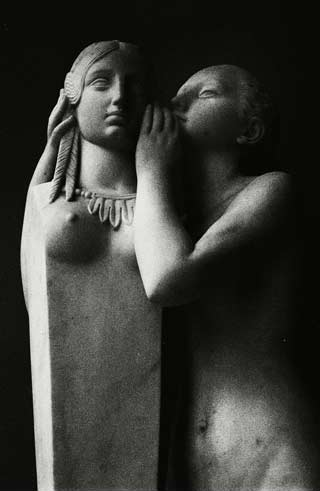
Premier secret confié à Vénus (The First Secret Confided to Venus, closeup), 1839.
