= Mark Nelson (scientist) =

American ecologist and original crew member of Biosphere 2

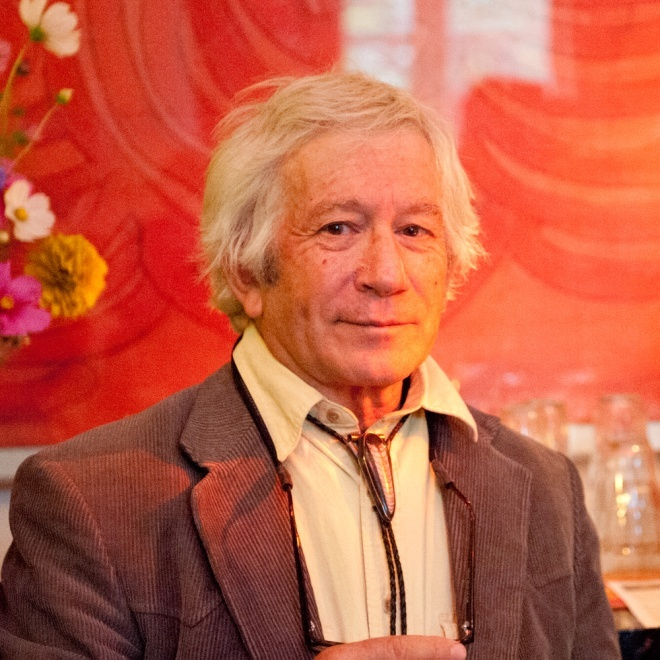
- Nelson in 2011 chairing the Institute of Ecotechnics annual conference
- Born: 1947 (age 78–79); Brooklyn, New York
- Education: Dartmouth College, BA 1968; University of Arizona, MSc 1996; University of Florida, PhD 1998
- Occupations: ecologist, author

Mark Nelson (born 1947) is an American ecologist and author based in Santa Fe, New Mexico. His research focuses on closed ecological system research, ecological engineering, restoration of damaged ecosystems, and wastewater recycling. The founding director of the Institute of Ecotechnics in 1973, Nelson was one of the eight original crew members of Biosphere 2 in 1991 and served as the Director of Earth and Space Applications for the project until 1994.

== Life and career ==
Nelson was born and raised in Brooklyn, New York. He majored in philosophy and pre-med at Dartmouth College and received his BA summa cum laude in 1968. After a stint in New York City working as a taxi driver, he arrived at the Synergia Ranch in New Mexico. The ranch, named for Buckminster Fuller's concept of synergy, was founded by John Allen and owned by Allen's wife Marie Harding. Its ranch hands also made furniture and pottery, studied ecology, and gave theatrical performances, occasionally touring under the name Theater of All Possibilities. It was at the ranch that the Institute of Ecotechnics was founded in 1973 with Nelson as its director.

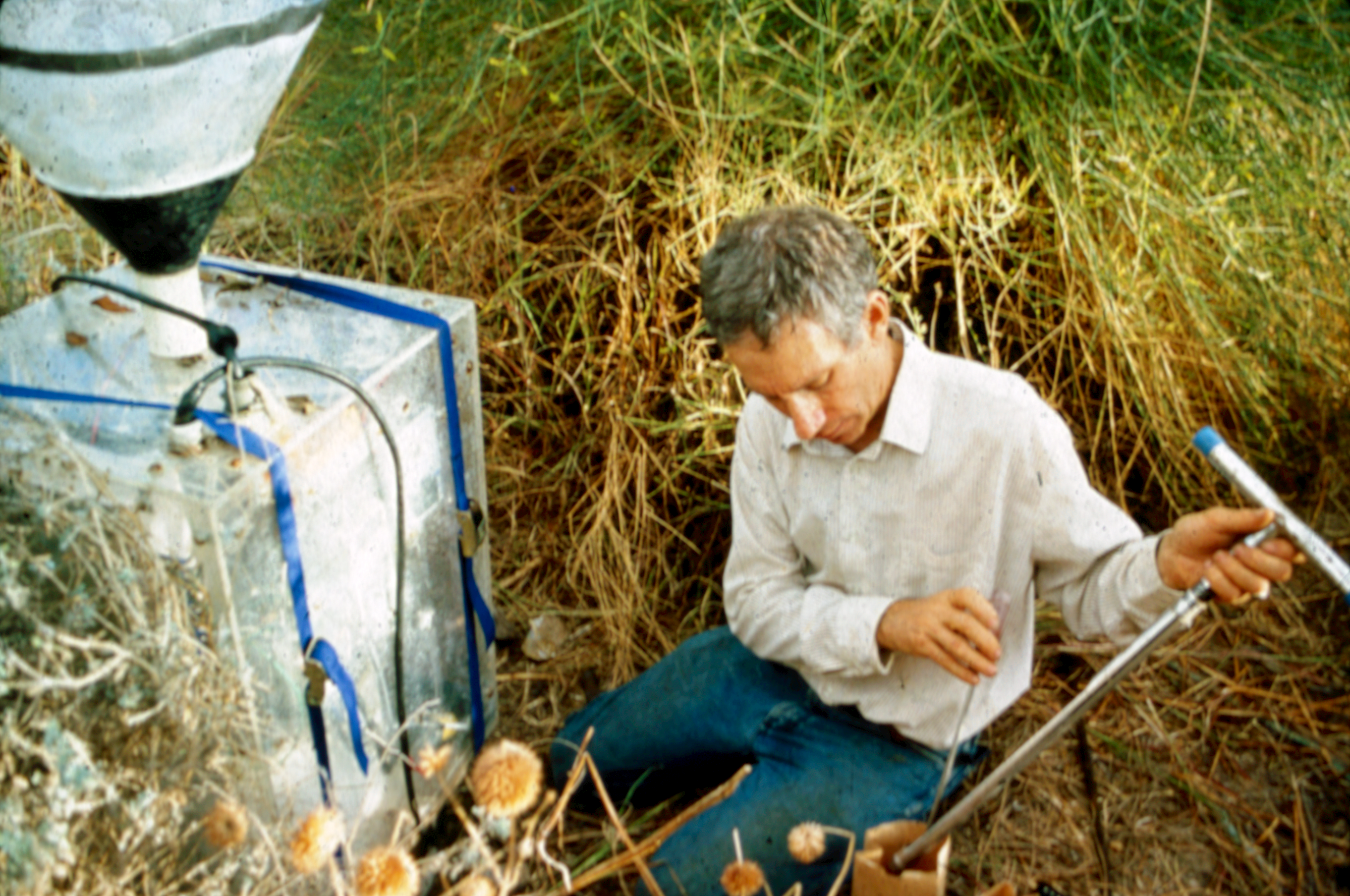
Nelson measuring soil moisture in Biosphere 2 during its 1991-1993 closure.

The Institute of Ecotechnics, which described itself as an ecological think tank was financed by Ed Bass, who also funded the Biosphere 2 project. In 1986, Nelson and John Allen had co-authored Space Biospheres, which outlined the plans for the biosphere and its scientific rationale. Nelson was one of the original eight crew members who remained in the closed environment of the Biosphere from 1991 until 1993 and was responsible for the animal fodder systems, managing the wilderness sections, and coordinating the transfer of data from Biosphere.

After the initial Biosphere 2 experiment ended in 1993, Nelson and his fellow crew member Abigail Alling published Life Under Glass: The Inside Story of Biosphere. Nelson then began graduate studies at the University of Arizona's School of Renewable Natural Resources, receiving his MSc in 1995. In the interim, disputes over the management of the next phase of the Biosphere project in 1994 had led to its financial backer Ed Bass placing the project into temporary receivership and relieving the project's chief management of their duties, including Nelson who was the Director of Earth and Space Applications. Nelson went on to study environmental engineering science under Howard T. Odum at the University of Florida's Center for Wetlands, and received his PhD in 1998 with a dissertation entitled Limestone wetland mesocosm for recycling saline wastewater in Coastal Yucatan, Mexico.

Nelson continues to publish papers on ecosystem research and engineering in journals such as Advances in Space Research and Life Sciences in Space Research and remains Chairman of the Institute of Ecotechnics. He resumed the post in 1982 after a seven-year period when it was run by Randall Gibson. Over the years, his work at the institute has included the founding in 1978 of the eco-station and desert reclamation project Birdwood Downs located at Meda Station in Western Australia and in 1983 of Las Casas de la Selva, a rainforest enrichment and sustainable forestry project in Puerto Rico. He is also the founder and principal of Wastewater Gardens International, a company which develops and promotes constructed wetlands.

== Publications ==
Nelson's publications include:

- Nelson, Mark (2018). Pushing Our Limit: Insights from Biosphere 2. Tucson, AZ: University of Arizona Press. ISBN 9780816537327.
- Nelson, Mark (2014). The Wastewater Gardener: Preserving the Planet One Flush at a Time. Santa Fe, NM: Synergetic Press. ISBN 9780907791515.
- Nelson, M., W. Dempster, J. Allen, (2013). "Key Ecological Challenges for Closed Systems Facilities". Advances in Space Research (2013) doi:10.1016/j.asr.2013.03.019
- Nelson, M., and Wolverton, B.C. (2011). "Plants + Soil/Wetland Microbes: Food Crop Systems that also Clean Air and Water". Advances in Space Research (2011) doi:10.1016/j.asr.2010.10.007
- Nelson, M., N.S. Pechurkin, J. Allen, L.A. Somova and J.I. Gitelson (2010). "Bioengineering of Closed Ecological Systems for Ecological Research, Space Life Support and the Science of Biospherics" in (eds. L. K. Wang, V. Ivanov and J.H. Tay) The Handbook of Environmental Engineering series, (10), 11. The Humana Press, Totowa, NJ.
- Nelson, M. (1997). "Bioregenerative Life Support Systems for Space Habitation and Extended Planetary Missions", pp. 315–336 in (ed. Churchill, S.). Fundamentals of Space Life Sciences, Orbit Books,
- Alling, A. and Nelson, M. (1993). Life Under Glass: The Inside Story of Biosphere 2. Biosphere Press:
- Allen, J. and Nelson (1986). Space Biospheres. Synergetic Press (the revised second edition was published in 1989)
