= Kathelin Gray =

American film producer

Kathelin Gray is an American director, writer and curator working across many forms. She has co-founded numerous projects which integrate ecology, science and culture. She writes and speaks on the intersection of art and the sciences.

Gray was a founder of the Institute of Ecotechnics in 1970 (incorporated in London in 1985) of which she is a director. The Institute was formed to harmonise Ecology and Technology by initiating collaborations between artists, scientists and explorers, as well as hands-on educational programmes and demonstration projects.

Gray is a member of the creative curatorial team of UK's Eden Project International..

Gray worked on the Biosphere 2 closed ecological system experiment in Arizona. She was on the Board of Directors for Biosphere 2. As Biospherian Trainer she researched small group behaviour in extreme environments and conducted workshops in group dynamics, speech and movement for the eight men and women who lived sealed inside the structure for two years. She appears in the documentary Spaceship Earth, about its history.

Gray helped build and worked with teams of the Research Vessel Heraclitus, a 25-meter ferrocement Chinese junk. Since 1975 its multicultural crew of explorers, researchers and artists have sailed the vessel over 270,000 miles, in every sea except the Arctic. She initiated a three-year expedition to study the changing port cultures of the Mediterranean entitled Lives and Legends of the Mediterranean Sea.

Gray co-founded the October Gallery in 1978, a charitable trust centred on showing the multicultural an avant-garde in Bloomsbury, London.

Gray was co-founder and artistic director of the Theater of All Possibilities from 1967 to 2009, which developed performances and strategies for long-duration interdisciplinary projects that, in some cases, spanned decades. It was based in Santa Fe, New Mexico and toured for 18 years. In 2009, with John "Dolphin" Allen, she co-founded the performance research initiative THEATRRR (Theatre for the Reconstitution of Reality).

She has produced and consulted on music and film. She produced Ornette: Made in America (1985), the documentary featuring musician and Free Jazz pioneer Ornette Coleman, directed by Shirley Clarke, Coleman composed a piece called "Kathelin Gray" that was released on his 1986 album "Song X", co-led by Pat Metheny. She has collaborated with William Burroughs, Brion Gysin, Steina and Woody Vasulka, Gustav Metzger and Godfrey Reggio.

Gray is a Fellow of the London Institute of Pataphysics.
