= LSSR =

LSSR may refer to:

- Lake Superior Scottish Regiment, a Canadian Infantry regiment
- Latvian Soviet Socialist Republic, now Latvia
- Lithuanian Soviet Socialist Republic, now Lithuania
- Life Sciences in Space Research, a journal published by COSPAR
- Indonesia large-scale social restrictions, Indonesian restrictions during COVID-19 pandemic
