= Theater of All Possibilities =

Theater of All Possibilities (TOAP), was an artistic practice network and touring theater founded in 1967 by John Allen, Kathelin Gray and Marie Harding in San Francisco, California, United States. The group worked with collaborators from the sciences, technology, history, and ecology, with the Institute of Ecotechnics as a partner organization on many projects.

== History ==
The Theater of All Possibilities network was based at Synergia Ranch near Santa Fe, New Mexico, from 1969–1980 and again from 2000–2010. Other studios within the network included: Studio 3, the Blue Planet Ensemble, based on the Research Vessel Heraclitus; Studio 6, based at the October Gallery in London; Studio 7, based at the Naga Theatre at the Hotel Vajra in Kathmandu; and Studio 10, which operated until 1994 at the Biosphere 2 laboratory in Oracle, Arizona.

An ensemble from the Theater of All Possibilities toured domestically and internationally from 1968 to 1989. A 1972 18-month world tour by the ensemble Caravan from Dramaturgia included a performance at Ellen Stewart's La MaMa Experimental Theatre Club in the East Village, Manhattan, New York City. The Caravan from Dramaturgia presented two pieces at La MaMa, Tamarand and The Caravan, on October 4, 5, 6, and 7. A promotional flyer for the production reads: "Every day we make up and wipe out our sets."

Theater of All Possibilities extended their practice into contributing to the founding of multiple ecological and cultural demonstration and performance projects. These projects included performances in the Australian Outback, the Peruvian Amazon, and the sacred forest in Osogbo, as well as traditional theater spaces.

The network was formally disbanded in 2009–2010.

Allen and Gray subsequently formed the performance research initiative Theatre for the Reconstitution of Reality (THEATRRR), also based in New Mexico. The Spaceship Earth (film) (2020) documentary featured the Theater of All Possibilities.
