= Institute of Ecotechnics =

Educational, training, and research charity

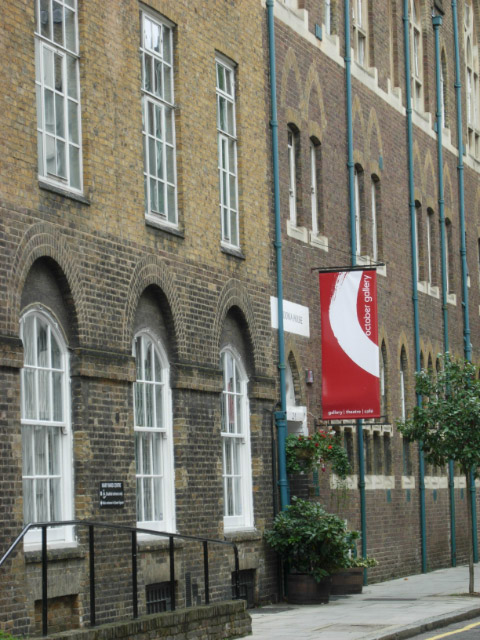
- The institute's London HQ.
- Formation: 1973
- Legal status: Charity
- Purpose: To develop and practice the discipline of ecotechnics: the ecology of technics, and the technics of ecology.
- Headquarters: London, England
- Services: Education and training; sponsors or undertakes research; acts as an umbrella or resource body.
- Website: ecotechnics.edu

The Institute of Ecotechnics is an educational, training and research charity with a special interest in ecotechnology, the environment, conservation, and heritage. With its U.K. headquarters in London, England and its U.S. affiliate in Santa Fe, NM, the institute was founded to "develop and practice the discipline of ecotechnics: the ecology of technics, and the technics of ecology."

Ecotechnology is a proposed applied science that deals with the relationship between humanity and the biosphere. It involves the use of technological means for ecosystem management. It seeks to fulfill human needs, based on a deep understanding of natural ecosystems, and minimizing disruption to those ecosystems.

The institute was founded and incorporated in New Mexico in 1973 by members of the counterculture community Synergia Ranch, and incorporated in the UK in 1985. It is a recognized charity in England, Wales, and the United States.

== Activities, Sailing ship ==
The Institute of Ecotechnics runs workshops, organizes conferences, and carries out ecological field research. It has developed agricultural, waste water and air purification, and biosphere technologies; and has published books on ecotechnics, ecological and cultural issues.

The ecological research vessel, Heraclitus, which the institute owns was designed and built with personnel from its first ecological project in New Mexico. The ship is a unique blend of ancient and modern: ferro-cement for its hull and deck, Chinese junk sails supplemented with diesel engine.The Heraclitus has sailed the oceans for decades since its launch in Oakland, California in 1975. It has made twelve expeditions,. Some of them were a three-year round the world voyage through the tropics exploring the origins of human culture. It also sailed up the Amazon River conducting ethnobotanical collections in Peru and circumnavigated South America with an expedition to Antarctica. It collected corals off the Yucatán coast for the Biosphere 2 project and from 1996 to 2008 teamed with the Biosphere Foundation to map and study coral reef health at many locations in the Pacific and Indian oceans. Its most recent work was an oral history project among the port and sea people of the Mediterranean. The RV Heraclitus is in drydock in Roses, Spain undergoing a nearly complete rebuild after sailing some 270,000 miles.

== Ecological field project consultancies ==
The institute is involved in a series of ecological demonstration projects, selected in challenging biomes facing ecological degradation and cultural conflict. These were chosen because conventional approaches do not work, requiring innovative, "ecotechic" approaches with the goals of ecological upgrade, economic sustainability and to develop the capabilities of I. E. members and associates. The projects, and the Heraclitus, are places where hands-on educational programsand volunteer opportunities are provided.

Synergia Ranch, started in 1969, was the institute's first ecological field project. There on 130 acres of desertifying high altitude sem-arid juniper/pinon grasslands, I.E. developed a program to restore the land, with the goal of creating an oasis in the desert. Over a thousand trees were planted, including 450 fruit trees, organic vegetable gardens and an extensive soil-building program using compost to restore lost fertility to an area which had been overgrazed and cleared for inappropriate broad-acre farming in the 1920s. Adobe buildings and a geodesic dome were built and artisan enterprises started including pottery, woodworking, iron working, clothing, leather. A construction firm build some three dozen adobe buildings in Santa Fe, contributing to a renaissance of traditional adobe architecture. The orchards and vegetable gardens are certified organic and in 2016 Synergia Ranch won the Good Earth award at the New Mexico Organic Agriculture conference in recognition of its land care. The ecotechnic life style approach was to balance by engaging in three lines of work: ecology, enterprise and theater. The Theater of All Possibilities was based at Synergia Ranch for over a decade.

Les Marronniers near Aix-en-Provence, France, begun in 1976 is the ecotechnic field project in the Mediterranean biome. It has also served as a frequent location for the international conferences which I.E. organizes bringing together scientists, artists, engineers, managers and thinkers to engage on topics of broad interest. Les Marronniers has also revivified on 7 ha (17 acres) the mixed agriculture small holdings traditional in the area, with orchard, grapes, field crops, woodlot, domestic animals and art/sculpture workshops.

Birdwood Downs, a 4300-acre property in the Kimberley region of NW Western Australia, is the institute's tropical savannah biomic project. Established in 1978, its goals are to regenerate an overgrazed ecology dominated by invasive scrub trees with drought-resistant grasses and legumes and to demonstrate ecotechnic ways of living within a sometimes harsh climate. Robyn Tredwell, a director of I.E., managed the project from 1985 until her death in 2012 and was honored by being selected as the 1995 Australian Rural Woman of the Year.

Recognizing that cities, part of the anthropogenic urban biome, are crucial players in the biosphere, I.E. helped establish the October Gallery in London in 1979 as its world city project. The October Gallery's goal is to find and showcase cutting-edge artists of the "transvangarde" from around the world. It also supports a robust educational program bringing many London school children into the gallery to meet artists and make art, as well as traveling exhibitions. Designed as a place where science and art can interact, it also hosts scientific, cultural and musical events.

In 1983, the Las Casas de la Selva project in Patillas, Puerto Rico became I.E. tropical rainforest project. On almost 1000 acres of mountainous secondary forest, the goal of the project is to show innovative methods of forest enrichment and to promote sustainable tropical forestry. With the cooperation of Puerto Rican departments of development and forestry, some 40,000 seedlings of valuable timber species were planted on one-third of the land. Line-planting was employed to minimize the impact on the surrounding forest and to conserve biodiversity. Las Casas won the 2016 Energy Globe national award for Puerto Rico and is recovering from severe damage caused by Hurricane Maria in 2017. During the island-wide cleanup from the Hurricane, Las Casas management are organizing the rescue of valuable hardwood trees felled which would otherwise be sent to landfills and wasted.

== Biosphere 2 ==
Space Biosphere Ventures' Biosphere 2 is another project in which the Institute of Ecotechnics was involved. I.E. served as an ecological systems consultant and managed the organizing of scientific and design workshops both at Biosphere 2 and a series of International Workshops on Closed Ecological Systems and Biospherics held at the Royal Society in 1987, at the Institute of Biosphysics (Bios 3) in Krasnoyarsk, Siberia in 1989, at Biosphere 2 in 1992 and at the Linnean Society of London in 1996. An Earth system science research facility or closed ecological system in Oracle, Arizona, its inventor was Institute of Ecotechnics director John P. Allen, and bankrolled by Texas financier, Ed Bass, who also served as an I.E. for many years. At the time, the Biosphere 2 project was the subject of much media attention, and there were allegations that this was not science but a stunt, and that the project had been a failure. Some of the controversy may have stemmed from the radical goals of the project - to develop methods of harmonizing its technosphere and living systems including a non-polluting, non-toxic farming, a challenge to business as usual which is damaging the Earth's biosphere. Also it fell into the contentious divide between analytic (reductionist) and integrative (holistic) science though the project employed both to create the world's first mini biosphere. These allegations have been strenuously denied and refuted by some of those involved, including ecologist and author Mark Nelson, the chairman of the Institute of Ecotechnics and a Biosphere 2 crew member from 1991 to 1993, and Bill Dempster, the Biosphere 2 Director of Systems Engineering until 1994. A wealth of scientific results have been published from the early closure experiments, 1991–1994, including a compendium of research papers published in the journal Ecological Engineering in reprinted as an Elsevier book, "Biosphere 2 Research Past and Present edited by H.T. Odum and Bruno Marino.

== Other consultancies and collaborations ==
The institute works in collaboration with the Biospherics Academy's Academia Biospherica program, which organizes workshops, lectures and events in the fields of restoration ecology, intercultural studies and the arts.

Past projects include consulting on the Hotel Vajra in Kathmandu, Nepal, working with a community of Tibetan refugees to create a travelers' hotel where East and West can meet. In Ft. Worth, I.E. was involved in the development of a jazz club, cultural and arts complex, the Caravan of Dreams, to help revive the city center.

Wastewater Gardens subsurface flow constructed wetland systems were tested inside Biosphere 2 to treat all wastewater as no additional pollution could be emitted within the enclosed environment. The productivity and added value was such that further study and refinement took place as of 1994 so that today systems have been installed in over 14 countries, greatly enhancing the environment and enabling added biodiversity. An environmentally-friendly approach to treating and recycling residential sewage, animal slurry and other types of contaminated water, protecting the groundwater and greening the landscape, constructed wetlands have been installed in many coastal and inland communities where human waste is not treated at all or only through septic tanks, which then seep into groundwater and eventually affect human health and the health of rivers, lakes and the ocean. I.E. has been highly active in spreading this technique on all continents and was involved in the first Wastewater Garden (constructed wetlands) project in Algeria and in other applications of the ecotechnic technology, including a proposed project to protect the Marsh Arabs and their environment from sewage pollution.

== Key figures ==
- John P. Allen
- Kathelin Gray
- Željko Malnar
- Mark Nelson

== See also ==
- Caravan of Dreams
- October Gallery
- Theater of All Possibilities
