= John P. Allen =

American systems ecologist

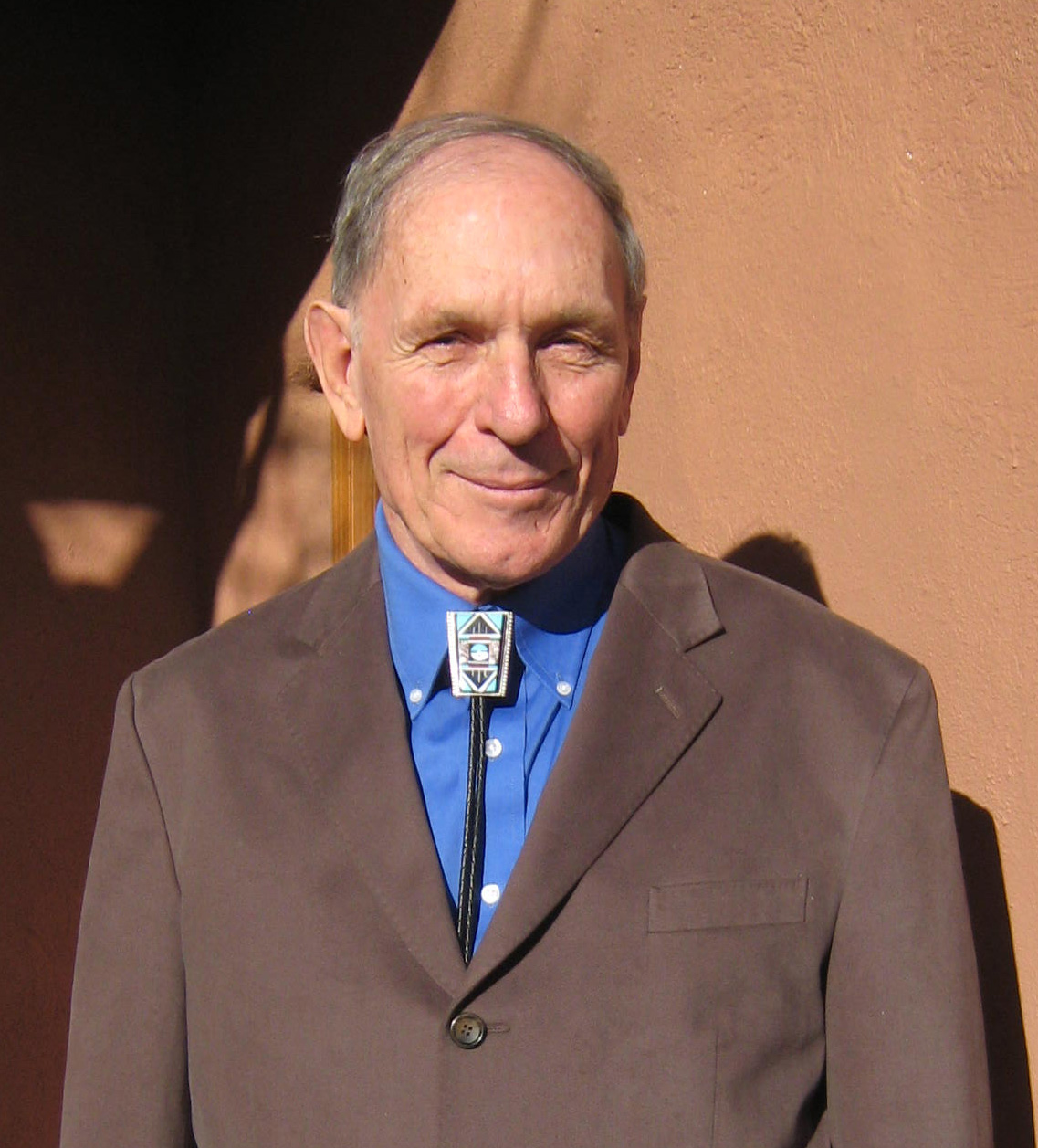
- Born: John Polk Allen; May 6, 1929 (age 97); Oklahoma, U.S.
- Education: Colorado School of Mines; Harvard Business School; Northwestern University
- Occupations: systems ecologist, engineer Metallurgist; Adventurer; Writer

John Polk Allen (born May 6, 1929, Carnegie, Oklahoma) is a systems ecologist, engineer, metallurgist, adventurer, and writer. Allen is a proponent of the science of biospherics and a pioneer in sustainable co-evolutionary development. He is the founder of Synergia Ranch, and is best known as the inventor and director of research of Biosphere 2, the world's largest vivarium and research facility to study global ecology. Biosphere 2 set multiple records in closed ecological systems work, including degree of sealing tightness, 100% waste and water recycle, and duration of human residence within a closed system (eight people for two years). He is also involved with forestry and reforestation in Puerto Rico where he owns a 1000-acre Mahogany tree farm at Patillas.

Allen was co-producer and dramaturg of Theater of All Possibilities, an internationally touring theater company, and has over two dozen publications to his credit (many under his nom de plume, Johnny Dolphin): half scientific, the remainder in poetry, plays, essays, short stories, novels, and autobiographical fiction. He currently serves as chairman of the Institute of Ecotechnics, an international project development and management company.

A fellow of the Linnean Society, the Royal Geographical Society, and the Explorer's Club, Allen has led multiple ecological expeditions, with a focus on the ecology of early civilizations, in Nigeria, Iraq, Iran, Afghanistan, Uzbekistan, Tibet, Turkey, India, and the Altiplano. He has been called a "swashbuckling frontiersman" and an "eccentric mix of scientist, artist, entrepreneur, and adventurer" by author David Jay Brown in the book Voices from the Edge (1995).

== Education ==
Allen graduated from Pauls Valley High School in 1946, where he served as editor of the school newspaper and was named valedictorian of his class. From 1946 to 1952 he studied anthropology and history at Northwestern and Oklahoma universities, writing at Stanford University, and served as a machinist in the US Army Corps of Engineers. He earned a metallurgical-mining engineer degree with honors from the Colorado School of Mines in 1957, where he was president of the student body and received the American Gentleman Award; a master's degree with distinction in business administration from Harvard Business School in 1962, where he was a Baker Scholar; and a Certificate in Advanced Physiological Systems for Engineers from the University of Michigan in 1971.

== Political activism ==
In 1951, Allen worked as a factory worker in a meat-packing plant in Chicago, becoming involved in various efforts of community and political activism, serving as the secretary of the Anti-Discrimination Committee for the UPWA-CIO District 10 (which represented 20,000 workers), and helping to organize and lead a march to free Willie McGee, whose conviction and death sentence for rape became a cause célèbre in the burgeoning civil rights movement. While organizing for the Meat Packers Union on the South Side of Chicago, Allen worked alongside acclaimed bass-baritone and actor Paul Robeson and sociologist and leading civil rights activist W.E.B. DuBois.

== Metallurgy ==
After spending the summer of 1956 conducting research on nickel ores for the Battelle Institute, Allen became a senior metallurgist for the Allegheny Ludlum Steel Corporation, where he headed a metals team that developed over thirty alloys to product status. He then became assistant to the vice-president for David Lilienthal's Development and Resources Corporation, conducting regional projects in Iran, Liberia, and the Ivory Coast, where he became proficient in complex regional development.

== Travels ==
In 1963, Allen self-financed a two-year sojourn around the globe by land and sea to study the origins of indigenous cultures and their various approaches to living within their ecosystems. His journeys took him to Africa, Uzbekistan, Afghanistan, Turkey, India, Nepal, Burma, Thailand, Malaysia, Singapore, Vietnam, Australia, Japan, and the Philippines. He mixed with Berbers and the avant-garde literary coterie in Tangiers; set up a painting studio in Fez, Morocco; hitch-hiked across North Africa from Tangiers to the Pyramids and Karnak; lived with tribal chiefs in Sudan; traveled with refugees to the Rann of Kutch in India and Pakistan, consulted for the international medical relief organization Project Concern International in Vietnam; lived on a junk with Tankas (Hong Kong boat people); and worked as a journalistic stringer to a foreign correspondent on the Ho Chi Minh trail in South East Asia (visiting twenty-three South Vietnamese provinces in a six-month period).

Allen's world travels led to his creating a synergistic approach to both science and art. Regarding the confluence of cultures he experienced in Tangiers, he said: "There was the avant-garde art culture with William Burroughs and the people around him, and then the Berber culture which is maybe 6,000 years old and has its roots in the ancient magical traditions, and also the imperial culture of the Spanish, French and British empires. So the combination of the Western imperial culture, the native Berber culture, and the Western avant-garde forced a personal transformation of all values, not just on a mental and emotional level, but on a physiological and social level as well."

== Theatrical and literary career ==
In 1967, Allen co-founded Theater of All Possibilities (TAP) in San Francisco with Kathelin Gray and Marie Harding, a theater company and artistic practice network that toured domestically and internationally from 1968 to 1989. The wandering troupe contributed to multiple agricultural, ecological, and cultural projects, including performances in the Australian Outback, Peruvian Amazon, and the sacred forest in Osogbo, Nigeria. Allen served as co-producer and dramaturge for TAP, founding ten studios while working with collaborators from the sciences, technology, history, and ecology. After the network was formally disbanded in 2010, Allen and Gray created the performance research initiative Theatre for the Reconstitution of Reality (THEATRRR).

Allen began writing poetry, novels, short stories, plays, and autobiographical fiction in earnest in the mid-60s, many of which appeared under the pen name Johnny Dolphin. Highly influenced by the Beat Generation poets and writers of the 1950s and 60s, Allen became a practitioner of the "Tangier School" writing style, a literary movement identified with the fiction of Paul Bowles, Jack Kerouac, and William Burroughs, and the "cut-up" techniques of Burroughs and Brion Gysin. Allen's books include the science-fiction novel Far Out and Far Away: A Novel of Emergent Evolution; poetry collections The Dream and Drink of Freedom, Off the Road, and Wild: Poems, Aphorisms and Short Stories; the short-story collection My Many Kisses; and a trilogy of autobiographical novels: 39 Blows on a Gone Trumpet, Journey Around an Extraordinary Planet, and Liberated Space. His plays have been performed on seven continents, and he has read his work in Paris at George Whitman's Shakespeare and Company, in New York City accompanied by Ornette Coleman, in London with West African musicians at the October Gallery, and in Fort Worth, Texas with the Caravan of Dreams.

Allen's autobiography, Me and the Biospheres (Synergetic Press, 2009), which provides a detailed description of the inspiration and experience that informed Biosphere 2, won the Benjamin Franklin Award for best autobiography/memoir of 2010. Allen was called "Borges with a sense of humor!" by Maria Golia of the Cairo Times.

== Synergia Ranch ==
In 1969, Allen co-founded and became general manager of Synergia Ranch near Santa Fe, New Mexico. The ranch was home to the TAP network from 1969 to 1980, and again from 2000 to 2010. Situated on 130 acres of high altitude grassland, Synergia leased space to architectural enterprises, conducted anti-desertification work, developed special ecologically sustainable agricultural systems, and performed research in solar and wind energy. Over a thousand trees were planted, including 450 fruit trees and organic vegetable gardens. An extensive soil-building program was established, adobe buildings and a geodesic dome designed by Buckminster Fuller were constructed, and subsequent artisan enterprises included pottery, wood, iron, clothing, and leather work. In conjunction with a local construction firm, Synergia built over three dozen adobe buildings in Santa Fe, contributing to a local renaissance of traditional adobe architecture. In 2016, Synergia won the Good Earth award at the New Mexico Organic Agriculture conference in recognition of its land care.

== Institute of Ecotechnics ==
In 1973, Allen co-founded and became director of the Institute of Ecotechnics (IE), an educational, training, and research charity dedicated to the synergetic applications of technology and ecology, the environment, conservation, and heritage. With its U.S. base at Synergia Ranch in Santa Fe and U.K. headquarters at October Gallery in central London (an art gallery founded by IE in 1979 dedicated to the promotion of trans-cultural avant-garde art and artists), IE has organized international conferences focusing on emerging research in biospherics and space exploration. Guest speakers have included architect and systems theorist Buckminster Fuller and adventurer and ethnographer Thor Heyerdahl.

In the early 1970s, in collaboration with TAP, IE constructed the ecological research vessel Heraclitus in Oakland, California, using a Chinese junk model. In 1978 the ship signed a cooperative agreement with the National Oceanographic and Atmospheric Administration to collect weather, wind, cloud, temperature, and rainfall data during its voyages. Heraclitus has since logged over 250,000 nautical miles and undertaken twelve expeditions, including a three-year round-the-world voyage and journey through the tropics exploring the origins of human culture. It has sailed up the Amazon conducting ethno-botanical collections, undertaken oral history documentation in the Mediterranean Sea, and circumnavigated South America with an expedition to Antarctica to study the humpback whale population.

In 1983, IE initiated Las Casas de la Selva (Houses of the Forest), a rainforest enrichment project in Puerto Rico, acquiring nearly 1000 acres of land adjacent to the Guavate-Carite Forest with the goal of establishing various methods of forest enrichment and to promote sustainable tropical forestry. With the cooperation of Puerto Rican departments of development and forestry, some 40,000 seedlings of valuable timber species were line-planted to minimize the impact on surrounding forest and conserve biodiversity. In 2017, Las Casas won the Energy Globe award for Puerto Rico. Allen is co-designer of Las Casas and serves as its ecological and business consultant.

== Biosphere 2 ==
In the mid-1980s, along with a team culled from IE that included Margret Augustine, Kathelin Gray, Mark Nelson, Marie Harding, and William F. Dempster, Allen formed the corporation Space Biospheres Ventures (SBV) to invent, construct, and manage Biosphere 2. Project funding came primarily from the joint venture's financial partner Edward Bass's Decisions Investment. The $250,000,000 project would conduct scientific, technical, and management research relevant to understanding the biosphere of the Earth, and as a prototype for permanent life habitats on suitable locations in space.

Allen was inventor, engineer, and executive chairman of Biosphere 2, which was designed to achieve a complex life-support system through the integration of seven areas or "biomes" — rainforest, savannah, desert, marsh, ocean, intensive agriculture, and human habitat. Unique bio-regenerative technologies, such as soil bed reactors for air purification, aquatic waste processing systems, real-time analytic systems, and complex computer monitoring and control systems were developed to create an experimental prototype and test-bed for the stable, permanent life systems needed for space colonization.

Between the years 1987–1991, SBV constructed the 7 million cubic foot (3.14 acres) Biosphere 2 in the foothills of the Santa Catalina Mountains in Oracle, Arizona, in the appropriately Mars-like Sonoran Desert. Allen began the first manned Biosphere Test Module experiment in September 1988, residing in the structure for three days, proving that closed ecological systems could work with humans inside and setting a world record at that time.

The first crew (four men and four women) sealed themselves inside Biosphere 2 on September 26, 1991, and began a two-year experiment to study how the ecosystems inside the artificial biosphere developed. As Allen described in a scientific paper published with Mark Nelson in 1997, "The main objective of the experiment was to determine if an artificial biosphere could operate, increasing storages of energy and biomass, preserving a high level of biodiversity and biomes, stabilizing its waters, soils and atmosphere, increasing information and providing a healthy and creative life for humans working as naturalists, ecosystem scientists, and technicians."

Biosphere 2 captivated the world's attention and imagination; Discover magazine asserted that Biosphere 2 was "the most exciting scientific project to be undertaken in the U.S. since President John F. Kennedy launched us toward the moon," and talk-show host Phil Donahue, in a live on-site broadcast, called Biosphere 2 "one of the most ambitious man-made projects ever."

=== Criticism ===
Biosphere 2 also generated controversy, stemming from a combination of cost overruns, operational challenges, group infighting, and a suspicion, amplified by the media, that Allen's vision for the project centered on how humans could survive the destruction of the planet in the event of nuclear holocaust. In 1991, the New York Times referenced Allen's quote from a 1985 publication, The Biosphere Catalogue (Synergetic Press, 1985), where he discussed how "higher forms of life" could survive the destruction of civilization in biospheres: "A hundred Refugia protected by their own energy resources in mountain caverns could release full-scale life after the skies begin to clear."

The ensuing media scrutiny cast doubt on Allen's goals and methods, and under increasing pressure he resigned as Executive Chairman. Commenting on his change of status, he said: "I feel that this was an unnecessary tragedy and I offer the hand of friendship to Ed Bass to reverse the ongoing calamity and put Biosphere 2 on sound footing for the future of humanity and science." Speaking on his treatment by the media, Allen clarified, "I said the Biosphere was a "Refugia". This word has a technical meaning in biology, it means a place that has a concentration of life diversity... this became, in certain sensationalist hands, interpreted as me being the head of an apocalyptic cult... You can't live in Biosphere 2 if Biosphere 1 were destroyed—at least on earth. It was a dumb smear job."

In June 1994, Allen and the board of SBV dissolved their partnership and transformed the joint venture into a corporation with Ed Bass as the majority owner of Biosphere 2. Allen and the SBV team then formed two new companies, Biospheres, LLC, to design and build the next generation of artificial biospheres, and EcoFrontiers LLC, to carry out projects in rainforest, savannah, sustainable agriculture, and urban biomes related to Earth biosphere problems. These two companies ultimately merged to form Global Ecotechnics Corporation (GCE), an international project development firm owning and managing sustainable ecological research projects, including: Las Casas de la Selva in Puerto Rico; Les Marroniers Conference Center and Provencal farm in Aix-en-Provence, France; Silver Hills Properties in Albuquerque, New Mexico; Lundonia House in London, England, and Birdwood Downs in West Kimberley, Australia. Since its inception, Allen has served as Chairman of GCE.

Despite the criticism that led to Allen's ouster, Biosphere 2 and its initial two-year experiment remains a significant scientific accomplishment, proving the viability of humans living in a man-made, fully recycling ecological system. A wealth of scientific results are available on the findings of the project, including a compendium of research papers published in the journal Ecological Engineering and reprinted in the book Biosphere 2 Research Past and Present. The New Yorker asserted, "Much of what is known about coral reefs and ocean acidification was originally discovered, improbably enough in Arizona, in the self-enclosed, supposedly self-sufficient world known as Biosphere 2." The Discovery Channel rated Biosphere 2 "third in top ten greatest engineering achievements of the twentieth century."

== Influences ==
Allen's work is influenced by the philosophy of geochemist and mineralogist Vladimir Vernadsky, most noted for his book The Biosphere (1926), and Buckminster Fuller, whose theories on whole-systems inter-relatedness was popularized by his two-volume work Synergetics: Explorations in the Geometry of Thinking (1975) and Synergetics 2: Further Explorations in the Geometry of Thinking (1979). He described Fuller's influence in an interview with the Italian contemporary art magazine Mousse: "Bucky was a science philosopher and I was an engineering philosopher, so I took it as an engineering problem. An act of putting together a beaucoup d'argent and a beaucoup d'intelligentsia. Or in other words, synergies. Bucky's the one who came up with and really developed the concept of synergy. But I had also developed that, independently, being a metallurgical engineer."

== Philosophy ==
Allen has spoken at a variety of international forums on the emerging science of biospherics; the implications of Biosphere 2 for health, environment, science, and culture; the key role of space biospheres to create data needed to understand Earth's biosphere; and on the necessity for humans to create harmony between ecological systems, world markets, and military technics. He has written or collaborated on over forty scientific publications, papers and presentations, many on biospheric and ecotechnic science and applications of systems ecology that informed Biosphere 2. Notable papers include "Ethnospherics: Origin of Human Cultures, Their Subjugation by the Technosphere, The Beginning of an Ethnosphere, and Steps Needed to Complete the Ethnosphere" (2003), which proposes the need for a cybersphere that gives immediate feedback on technological impacts to the biosphere; and "The Evolution of Humanity: Past, Present, and Possible Future" (2000), which posits that humanity requires a stand-alone taxonomic classification, separate from the primate order of the animal kingdom.

In 1996, Allen delivered a speech at Buckminster Fuller's memorial where he offered insight into the exploratory spirit and synergistic philosophy the two men shared: "I think adventure is where human beings can find the best route to the answer of the question, "Who am I?" You don't have to justify climbing Mount Everest, you don't have to justify diving deeper into the oceans than anyone before, and you don't have to justify going into space. It's an end in itself because it leads to contemplation... It takes you out of superstition and fanaticism. That may be its greatest benefit."

== See also ==
- Biosphere 2
- Caravan of Dreams
- Institute of Ecotechnics
- Theater of All Possibilities
- Synergia Ranch
- October Gallery
