= Confined environment psychology =

Subcategory of environmental psychology

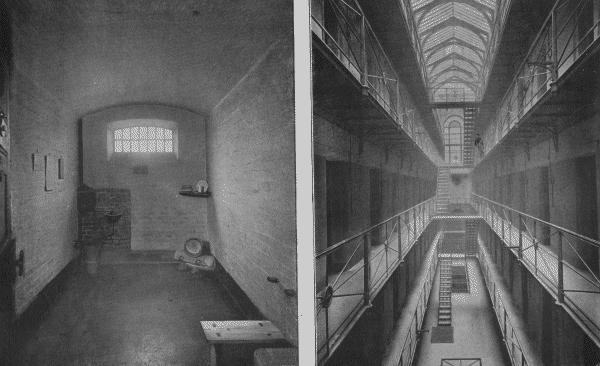
Example of a confined environment

Confined environment psychology is a refined subcategory of environmental psychology. There can be severe neurological impacts upon remaining in a confined environment over a prolonged period of time. Confined environment psychology can come in different forms, including; by location and lack of or limited human interaction. The broad subcategory also includes the effects of social isolation on animals.

== Behavioural and neurological impacts of confined environments ==
Solitary confinement and isolation can have severe psychological effects and is heavily dependent on the extent of isolation, particularly for prisoners. A study conducted by Stuart Grassian stated some of the behavioural effects of solitary confinement and isolation include agitative behaviour, hallucinations and restlessness. Solitary confinement and isolation can disrupt the function of neurotransmitter systems, which result in unusual behaviour.

Mice experience similar behaviour to humans, including agitation and aggression, fear and hypersensitivity to unfamiliar objects that are viewed as a threat. Neurologically, chronic social isolation for mice activates a neuropeptide found in the central nervous system known as tachykinin. Tachykinin (also known as the TACC2 gene for mice) is produced in the amygdala and hypothalamus of a mouse's brain. These regions of the mouse brain directly control the behaviour of mice emotionally and socially. Suppressing certain neurochemicals can have an adverse effect on the behaviour of mice.

== By location ==
Various experiments have been conducted that physically confine human beings based on location.

=== Antarctica ===
Isolation experiments conducted in Antarctica analysed the dynamics of human relationships during prolonged periods of time. Participants at Concordia Antarctic Research Station experienced different psychological outcomes. Although cognitive performance generally remains unchanged, inactive participants were demotivated and physically strained, whereas the active group were psychologically and physically stable. Given the psychological and physical isolation of residing in Antarctica, there were higher rates of self-diagnosed depression, lower blood pressure levels and lower adrenaline.

=== The Zimbardo Experiment ===
Another example of a physical confined environment is the Stanford environment prison test, also known as the Zimbardo experiment. The Zimbardo experiment was conducted by an American psychologist and Stanford University Professor named Phillip Zimbardo in 1971. Using the bottom level of the Psychology building in Stanford University, Zimbardo transformed it into a mock prison, whereby random participants were assigned different prison roles, including prisoners and guards. Each participant was given an ID number and prison uniform to deprive them of their identity. The participants were given their assigned roles and soon started behaving as they were legitimately a prisoner or a prison guard. Those assigned as prison guards began to adopt authoritative mannerisms and asserted their dominance over the prisoners by punishing them physically, often through push-ups. The psychological impact of being in a confined prison was demonstrated when Prisoner #8612 experienced uncontrollable rage within 36 hours of the experiment.

=== Simulated Mars Missions ===
NASA-funded isolation experiments designed to simulate missions to Mars have examined the social and individual psychological conditions of living on Mars for 32 to 33 months. The research conducted by Michigan State University Professor Steve Kozlowski addressed team cohesion in confined environments. Experiments have been performed around the Mauna Loa volcano in Hawaii and Antarctica to mimic the isolated conditions of Mars.

=== Hospital patient isolation ===
A study conducted by US hospitals in relation to changes in patient psychology when in contact isolation due to being infected with multi-drug resistant organisms (MDROs). Precautions to reduce the spread of MDROs had adverse psychological effects for patients, specifically an increase in the severity of mental health issues including depression and anxiety. The outcome of the patient isolation studies resulted in nosocomial infection, whereby the infection is borne within the hospital. The scoring scales used for the studies included Hamilton Anxiety/Depression Rating Scale (HAM-D) and the Self-Esteem Scale (SES). This study requires larger studies to be conducted to be more accurate in results.

=== Homogeneous environment psychology ===
Living in a homogeneous country is a form of social isolation that can have several psychological effects on an individual. Saudi Arabia is an example of a culturally homogeneous country, whereby individuals are viewed as a collectivist society. With the whole population being of Muslim faith, an established way of thinking has been developed, predominantly influenced by Islamic beliefs and values. Saudi Arabian people share the same taboo topics, due to the profound link between religion and government. Arabs typically share the mentality that life is "in the hands of Allah (God)", therefore a stigma has been formed against the practice of psychology in the Arab world. Being in a confined country bounded by religious beliefs and stern traditions has resulted in individuals being bounded by narrow mentalities. With the government removing the ban on female drivers on 24 June 2018, the empowerment of women is being initiated, and culture, religion and government are being separated.

== Confined work environments ==
=== Royal Navy personnel experiment ===
Confined work environments can have significant psychological and physical effects on individuals. A 2010 study on Royal Navy personnel., conducted by the Institute of Naval Medicine in Hampshire, investigated the negative effects associated with occupational stress, specifically when working in submarines. Factors that can affect the work of personnel include the mood of the individual. According to the study, workers remain in a positive mood during and after the mission, however, may experience a negative mood when reflecting on the remaining duration of the mission. The 'salutogenic effect' is presented, although this largely relied on consistent interaction with families for workers to be in a positive mood. High extraversion, interpersonal sensitivity, and emotional stability enhanced mental resilience of confined workers. The results of the study stated that from 1999 to 2007, submariners that had stress increased by 9%, from 31% in 1999 to 40% in 2007

== Limited social interaction ==
Social environment confinement produces similar effects to physical confined environments. The AARP study on social isolation by age, the Amish community, Oxana Malaya (the feral child), Amala and Kamala (the "wolf-like children") and mice/rat experiments are examples of psychological changes caused by limited social interaction.

=== Social isolation by age ===
A 2018 study conducted by the American Association of Retired Persons (AARP) deconstructs the effects of social isolation on adults over 40 years old (Anderson & Thayer, 2018). The survey conducted by the AARP, consisting of a sample size of 1,300 adults aged over 40, found that two-thirds of the sample believed social isolation is triggered by a specific event, however other factors that contribute to social isolation also included lack of community facilities in health and wellbeing that can increase the severity of social isolation. The study debunked commonly believed myths about social isolation, with 82% of the sample size believing married people cannot be lonely since they have a partner around, however this myth was deemed false. The myth that prolonged periods of social isolation is equivalent to smoking 15 cigarettes per day was not commonly known, with 28% of the sample size answering correctly (Anderson & Thayer, 2018).

=== The Amish community ===
The Amish community, primarily found in Ohio and Pennsylvania, are a religious group that follow a strict lifestyle and limit their social interactions to their own community. When an Amish person marries with a non-Amish person, they are shunned by the community. The Amish community refrain from using advanced technologies, and other facilities that go against their Ordnung, which is their set of rules for daily life. The Ordnung includes the prohibition of public electricity and automobiles. This also applies to the installation of phones within households, however Amish people still recognise the need for phones for communication purposes. The confined mentality of having limited social interaction results in the Amish people being very family-oriented and reliant on family connections for business, particularly for farming practices.

=== Oxana Malaya (feral child) ===
Oxana Malaya, a Ukrainian woman raised by dogs, was also in a confined environment due to her limited social interaction. In 1991, the feral child was found living with a pack of dogs, adopting the behaviour of dogs by barking and using all four legs. Though she returned to a relatively normal lifestyle after the discovery of her behaviour, British child psychologist Lyn Fry visited Oxana 5 years after her appearance on the Discovery Channel. Lyn Fry examined her mannerisms, stating that "her language is odd". Fry made further commented that though her orientation towards humans has improved, there are still some behavioural aspects that still resemble dog-like gestures.

=== Amala and Kamala ===
Amala and Kamala were two girls, commonly known as the "wolf-children" due to their feral upbringing in Midnapore, India. The siblings were hidden from the media as an Indian reverend took them to an orphanage. The observed behaviour of the "wolf-children" suggested they did not understand human behaviour and emotions, and were unable to feel affection from other people. The behaviour of the youngest sibling, Kamala, demonstrated a subtle change following the death of his sibling Amala, who died due to "severe diarrhea caused by an infestation of worms". Changes in behaviour included the development of understanding human emotions (as Kamala first cried following Amala's death) and human speech

== Experiments using animals ==
Scientists have utilised rats to conduct experiments to examine behaviour within confined environments. Manipulating a rat's environment to analyse their behaviour to social isolation has neurological differences, which resemble symptoms of schizophrenia. Such symptoms include memory impairment and hyperactivity. MRI scans of rats in social isolation were performed, and differences in the right and left medial prefrontal cortex (mPFC) were prevalent as it became delineated. The disruption of neurobiological composition of sensorimotor gating is found for both socially isolated rats and non-medicated people with schizophrenia.

In 2015, another controlled experiment was conducted which explored depression for female rats as a result of social isolation. Conclusions for this experiment stated that the female rats did experience depression, however the anti-depressant drug amitriptyline is able to counteract the psychological effects of the experiment.

A 2003 report states that isolation over longer timeframes results in increased fear and agitation amongst mice, showing signs of anxiety and depression. Changes in behaviour for an isolated mouse in comparison to a group of isolated mice differs, as a completely isolated mouse shows more aggression. Male and female mice react differently to stimuli. Males tend to engage more in general activity than females, whereas females are more likely to experience catalepsy earlier on in the timeframe of the study. Both male and female isolated mice experienced a lack of sleep in comparison to their corresponding gender's group house
