= Synergia Ranch =

New Mexico ecovillage (1969–)

Coordinates: 35°29′27.3″N 106°5′45.6″W

Synergia Ranch is an ecovillage founded in 1969 by John P. Allen, the inventor of Biosphere 2 and Marie Harding, its present manager. It is located in Santa Fe County, New Mexico, 15 miles south of the city of Santa Fe. Synergia Ranch operates as a private retreat and workshop center for small groups.

== History ==
In the 1970s, businessman and philanthropist Ed Bass was a regular visitor to the counterculture community, later becoming a director of the Institute of Ecotechnics that Allen and other Synergia Ranch members founded, and financing much of their work. The Theater of All Possibilities (TOAP) network was based out of Synergia Ranch.

In 1984, Bass and Allen launched the Biosphere 2 project (for which Bass provided $150 million in funding until 1991), partially inspired by ideas Allen had advocated at Synergia Ranch, such as Buckminster Fuller's "Spaceship Earth". Several other former members of Synergia Ranch also joined Biosphere 2.
