= Biosphere 2 =

Closed ecological research center in Arizona

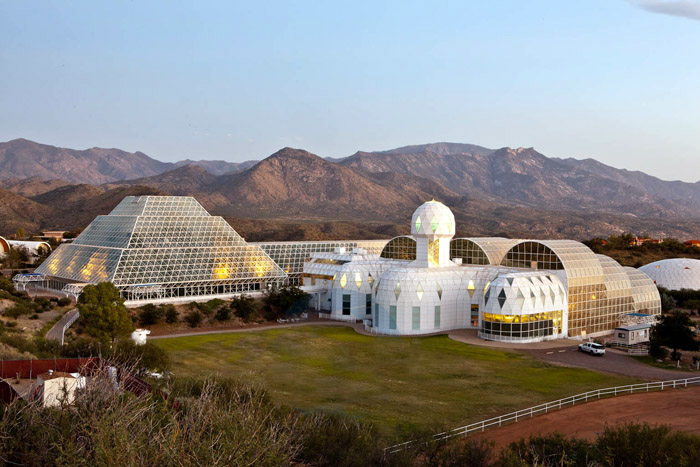
- Exterior of Biosphere 2

- Location within Arizona Location within the United States

General information
- Type: Research facility
- Location: Oracle, Arizona, United States, 32540 S Biosphere Rd, Oracle, AZ 85739
- Coordinates: 32°34′44″N 110°51′02″W
- Elevation: 3,820 ft (1,164 m)
- Construction started: 1987
- Completed: 1991
- Owner: University of Arizona

Technical details
- Floor area: 3.14 acres (12,700 m^{2})
- Grounds: 40 acres (160,000 m^{2})

Website
- biosphere2.org

University of Arizona Biosphere 2 is an American Earth system science research facility located in Oracle, Arizona. Its mission is to serve as a center for research, outreach, teaching, and lifelong learning about Earth, its living systems, and its place in the universe. It is a 3.14-acre (1.27-hectare) structure originally built to be an artificial, materially closed ecological system, or vivarium. It remains the largest closed ecological system ever created. Constructed between 1987 and 1991, Biosphere 2 planned to experiment with the viability of closed ecological systems to support and maintain human life in outer space as a substitute for Earth's biosphere.

Biosphere 2 was designed to explore the web of interactions within life systems in a structure with different areas based on various biological biomes. In addition to the several biomes and living quarters for people, it hosted an agricultural area and a work space to study the interactions between humans, farming, technology and the rest of nature as a laboratory for the study of the global ecology. Its mission was a two-year closure experiment with a crew of eight humans. Long-term it was seen as a precursor to gaining knowledge about the use of closed biospheres in space colonization. As an experimental ecological facility it allowed the study and manipulation of a mini biospheric system.

Its seven biome areas included a 1,900-square-meter (20,000 sq ft) rainforest, an 850-square-meter (9,100 sq ft) ocean with a coral reef, a 450-square-meter (4,800 sq ft) mangrove wetlands, a 1,300-square-meter (14,000 sq ft) savannah grassland, and a 1,400-square-meter (15,000 sq ft) fog desert. it also housed two anthropogenic biomes; a 2,500-square-meter (27,000 sq ft) agricultural system and a human habitat with living spaces, laboratories and workshops. Heating and cooling water circulated through independent piping systems and passive solar input through the glass space frame panels covering most of the facility, and electrical power was supplied into Biosphere 2 from an onsite natural gas power plant.

Biosphere 2 was used twice for its original intended purposes as a closed-system experiment, once from 1991 to 1993, and again in March to September 1994. Both attempts ran into problems including low amounts of food and oxygen, die-offs of many animals and plants included in the experiment (though this was anticipated since the project used a strategy of deliberately "species-packing" anticipating losses as the biomes developed), group dynamic tensions among the resident crew, outside politics, and a power struggle over management and direction of the project. The second closure experiment concluded early but achieved total food sufficiency and did not require injection of oxygen.

In June 1994, during the middle of the second experiment, the managing company, Space Biosphere Ventures, was dissolved, and the facility was left in limbo. Columbia University assumed management of the facility in 1995, using it to run experiments until 2003. The facility was at risk of demolition but was taken over for research by the University of Arizona in 2007. The University of Arizona took full ownership of the structure in 2011. Research continues at the Biosphere 2, with the facility also being available to the public.

Biosphere 2 is one of two enclosed artificial ecosystems in the Americas that are open to the public, the other being the Montreal Biodome.

== Location ==
The glass and spaceframe facility is located in Oracle, Arizona, at the base of the Santa Catalina Mountains, about 50 minutes north of Tucson. Its elevation is around 4,000 feet (1,200 m) above sea level.

== Engineering ==
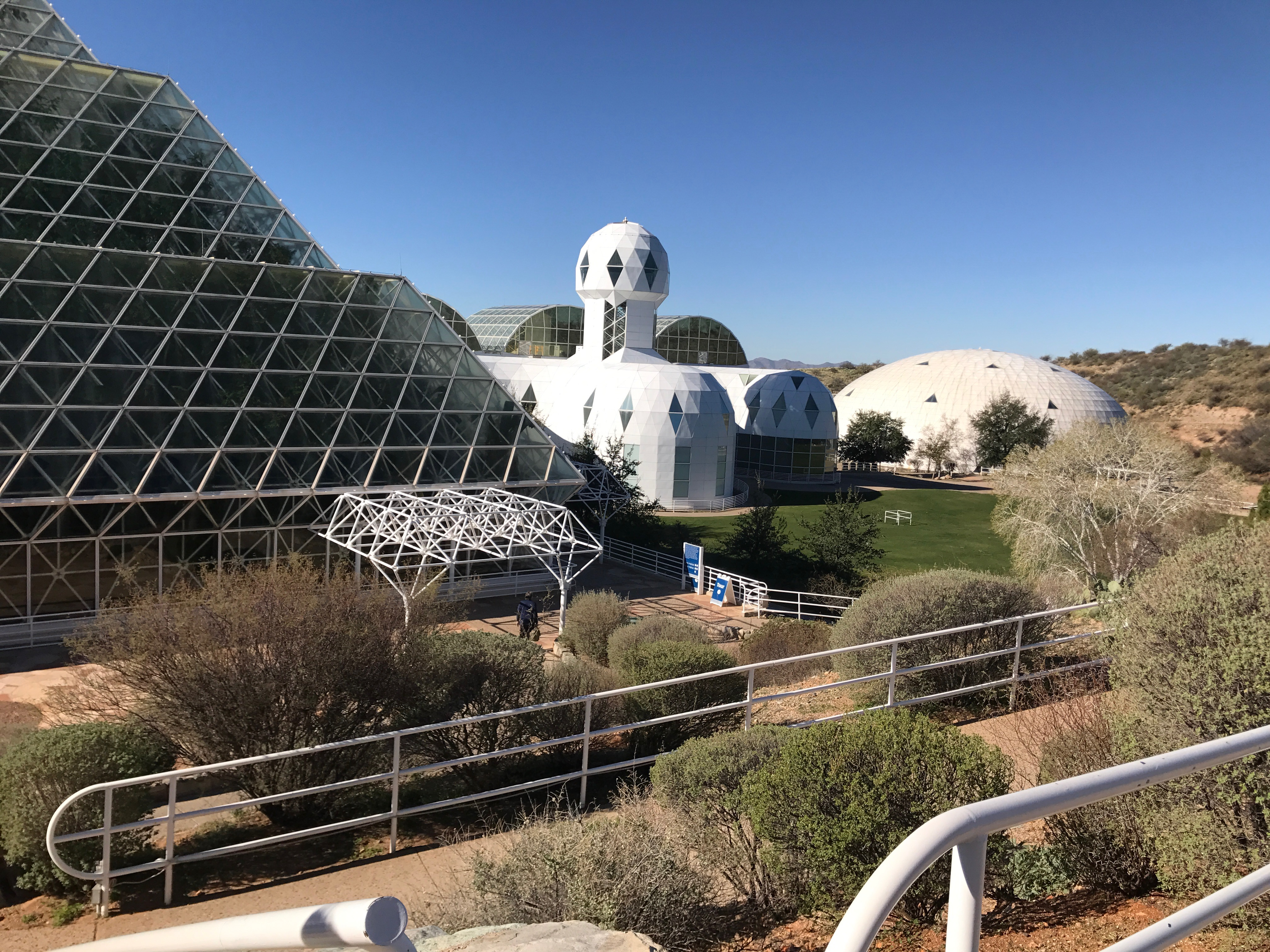
Exterior showing parts of the rainforest biome and of the habitat, with the West lung in the background

The above-ground physical structure of Biosphere 2 is made of steel tubing, high-performance glass and steel frames. The frame and glazing materials were designed and made to specification by a firm run by an associate of Buckminster Fuller, Peter Jon Pearce (Pearce Structures, Inc.). The window seals and structures were designed to be almost perfectly airtight, such that the air exchange would be extremely low, permitting tracking of subtle changes over time. The patented airtight sealing methods, developed by Pearce and William Dempster, achieved a leak rate of less than 10% per year. Without such tight closure, the slow decline of oxygen which occurred at a rate of less than 0.25% per month during the first two-year closure experiment may not have been detected.

During the day, the heat from the sun caused the air inside the facility to expand, during the night the air cooled and contracted. To avoid dealing with the huge forces created by maintaining a constant volume, the structure had large diaphragms kept in domes called "lungs" or variable volume structures.

The structure required a sophisticated system to regulate temperatures within desired parameters, which varied for the different biomic areas. Though cooling was the largest energy need, heating had to be supplied in the winter and closed loop pipes and air handlers were key parts of the energy system. An energy center on site provided electricity and heated and cooled water, employing natural gas and backup generators, ammonia chillers and water cooling towers.

== History ==
=== Planning and construction ===
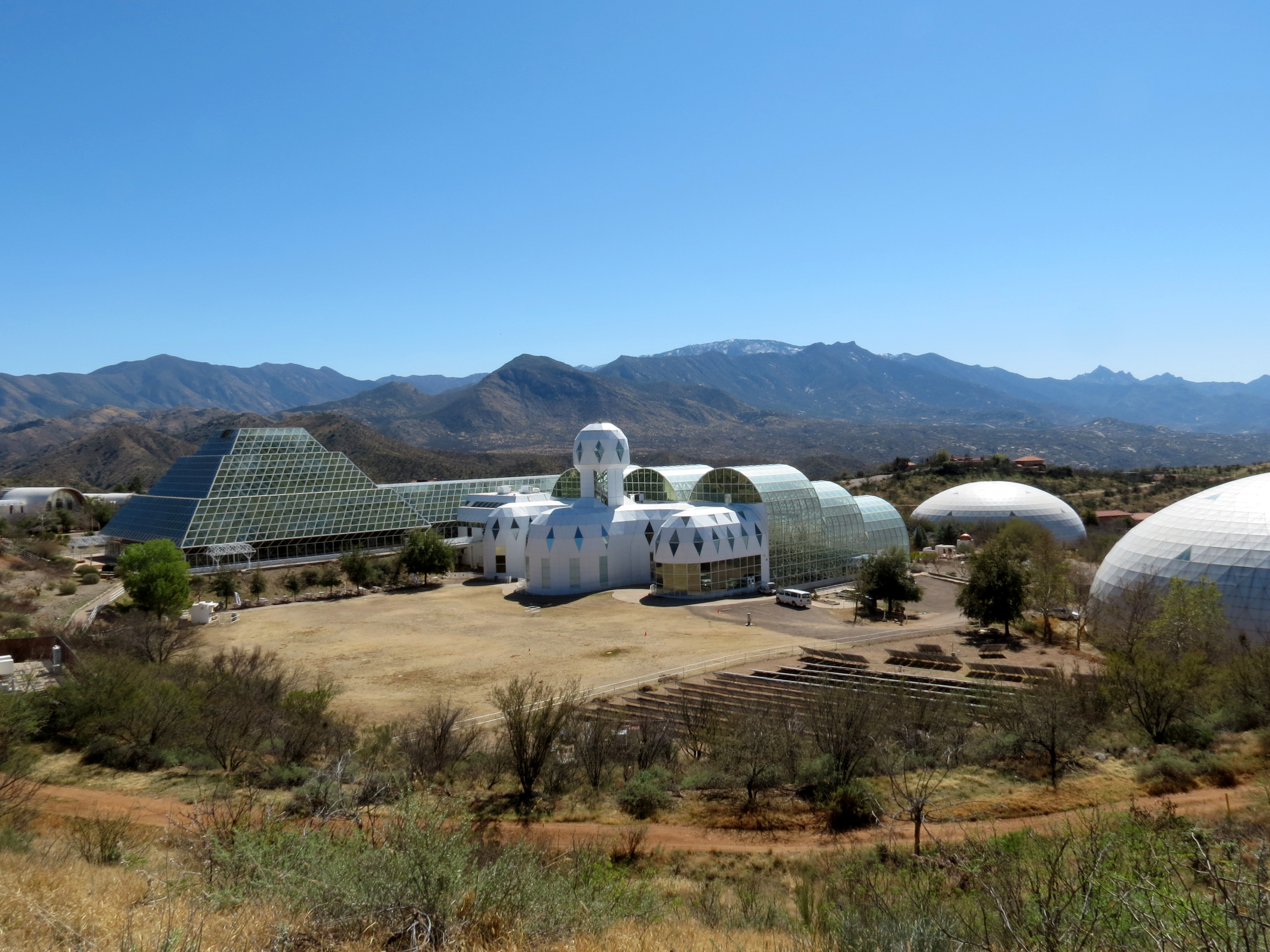
Biosphere 2, with upgraded solar panels in foreground, sits on a sprawling 40-acre (16-hectare) science campus that is open to the public.

The Biosphere 2 project was launched in 1984 by businessman and billionaire Ed Bass and systems ecologist John P. Allen, with Bass providing US$150 million in funding until 1991. Bass and Allen had met in the 1970s at the Synergia Ranch, a counterculture community led by Allen, who advocated Buckminster Fuller's "Spaceship Earth" concept and explored the idea of biospheres as a refuge from disasters such as nuclear war. Several other former members of Synergia Ranch also joined the Biosphere 2 project.

Construction was carried out between 1987 and 1991 by Space Biosphere Ventures, a joint venture whose principal officers were John P. Allen, inventor and executive chairman; Margaret Augustine, CEO; Marie Harding, vice-president of finance; Abigail Alling, vice president of research; Mark Nelson, director of space and environmental applications, William F. Dempster, director of system engineering, and Norberto Alvarez-Romo, vice president of mission control.

It was named "Biosphere 2" because it was meant to be the second fully self-sufficient biosphere, after the Earth itself ("Biosphere 1").

=== First mission (1991–1993) ===
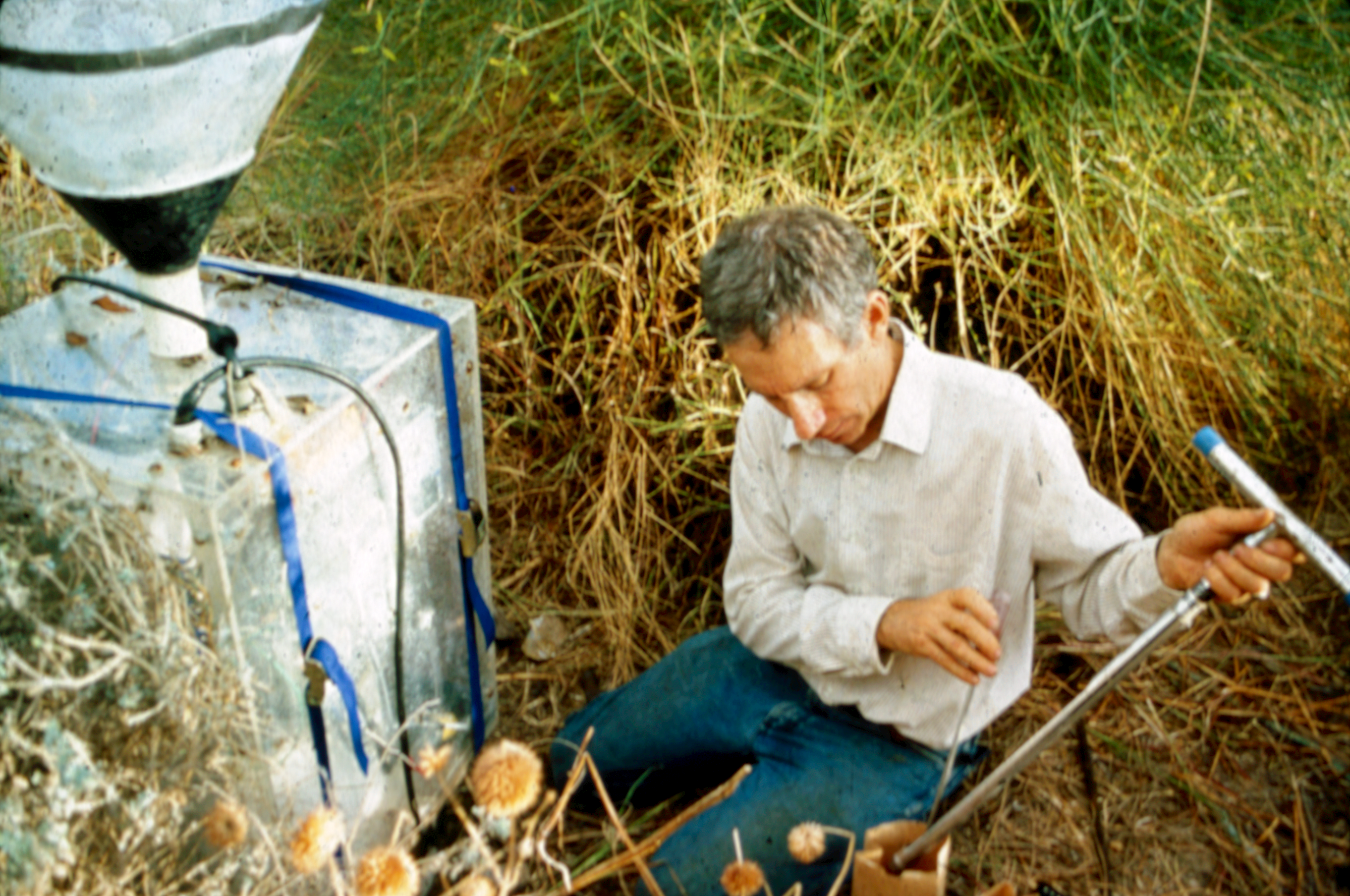
First mission crew member Mark Nelson measuring soil moisture next to CO_{2} efflux device in 1993

External videos
- Odyssey in Two Biospheres – documentary film with historical footage of the first mission of Biosphere 2, reflections from three of the original mission members, and their life after re-entry into Biosphere 1 (full episode)

The first closed mission lasted from September 26, 1991, to September 26, 1993. The crew consisted of four women and four men; medical doctor and researcher Roy Walford, Jane Poynter, Taber MacCallum, Mark Nelson, Sally Silverstone, Abigail Alling, Mark Van Thillo, and Linda Leigh.

The agricultural system produced 83% of the total diet, which included crops of bananas, papayas, sweet potatoes, beets, peanuts, lablab and cowpea beans, rice, and wheat. The eight inhabitants reported continual hunger, especially in the first year. Calculations indicated Biosphere 2's farm was among the highest producing in the world "exceeding by more than five times that of the most efficient agrarian communities of Indonesia, southern China, and Bangladesh".

The participants consumed the same low-calorie, nutrient-dense diet that Roy Walford had studied in his research on extending lifespan through diet. Medical markers indicated the health of the crew during the two years was excellent. They showed the same improvement in health indices such as lowering of blood cholesterol, blood pressure, and enhancement of immune system. They lost an average of 16% of their pre-entry body weight before stabilizing and regaining some weight during their second year. Subsequent studies showed that the biospherians' metabolism became more efficient at extracting nutrients from their food as an adaptation to the low-calorie, high-nutrient diet.

Some of the domesticated animals that were included in the agricultural area during the first mission included: four African pygmy goat does and one billy; 35 hens and three roosters (a mix of Indian jungle fowl (Gallus gallus), Japanese silky bantam, and a hybrid of these); two sows and one boar Ossabaw dwarf pigs; and tilapia fish grown in a rice and azolla pond system.

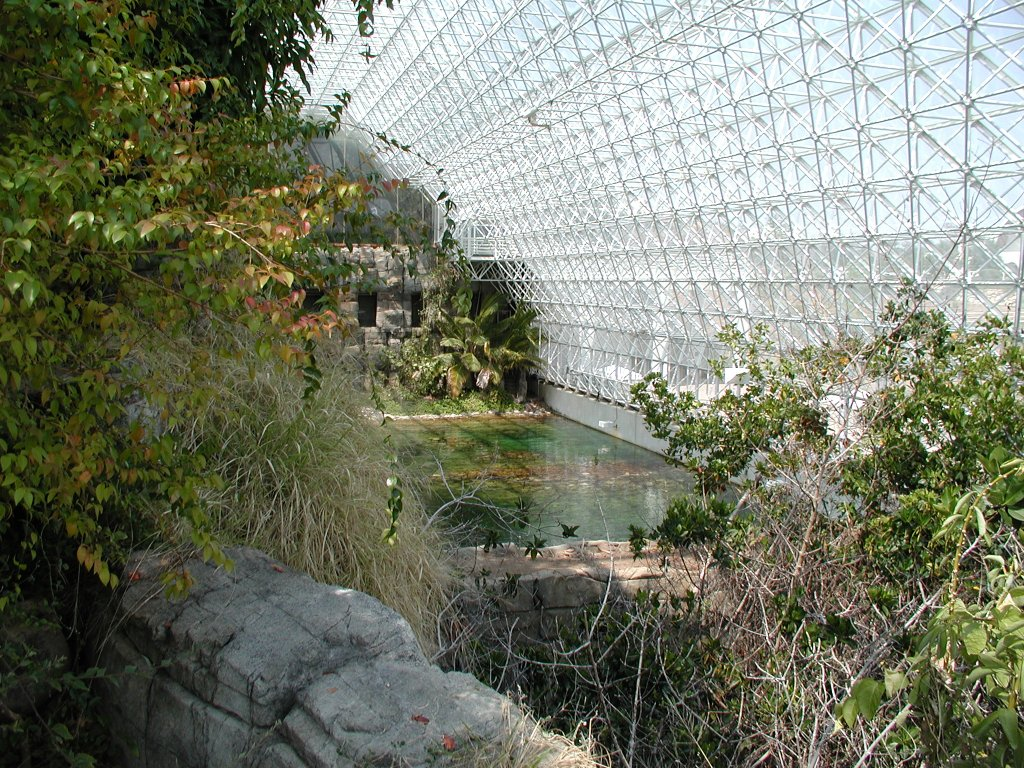
Biosphere 2, viewed from the thornscrub, a transition zone between Savannah and Desert (foreground) and Ocean (background) sections

A strategy of "species-packing" was practiced to ensure food webs and ecological function could be maintained if some species did not survive. The fog desert area became more chaparral in character due to condensation from the space frame. The savannah was seasonally active; its biomass was cut and stored by the crew as part of their management of carbon dioxide. Rainforest pioneer species grew rapidly, but trees there and in the savannah suffered from etiolation and weakness caused by lack of stress wood, normally created in response to winds in natural conditions. Corals reproduced in the ocean area, and crew helped maintain the health of the ocean system by hand-harvesting algae from the corals, manipulating calcium carbonate and pH levels to prevent the ocean from becoming too acidic, and by installing an improved protein skimmer to supplement the algae turf scrubber system originally installed to remove excess nutrients. The mangrove area developed rapidly but with less understory than a typical wetland, possibly because of reduced light levels. Nevertheless, it was judged to be a successful analogue to the Everglades area of Florida where the mangroves and marsh plants were collected.

Biosphere 2, because of its small size and buffers, and concentration of organic materials and life, had greater fluctuations and more rapid biogeochemical cycles than are found in Earth's biosphere. Most of the introduced vertebrate species and virtually all of the pollinating insects died, though there was reproduction of plants and animals. Insect pests, like cockroaches, flourished. A globally invasive tramp ant species, Paratrechina longicornis, had come to dominate other ant species. The planned ecological succession in the rainforest and strategies to protect the area from harsh incident sunlight and salt aerosols from the ocean worked well, and a surprising amount of the original biodiversity persisted. Biosphere 2 in its early ecological development was likened to an island ecology.

=== Group dynamics: psychology, conflict, and cooperation ===
Part of the crew dining room, serving counter from kitchen and stairway up to an entertainment area

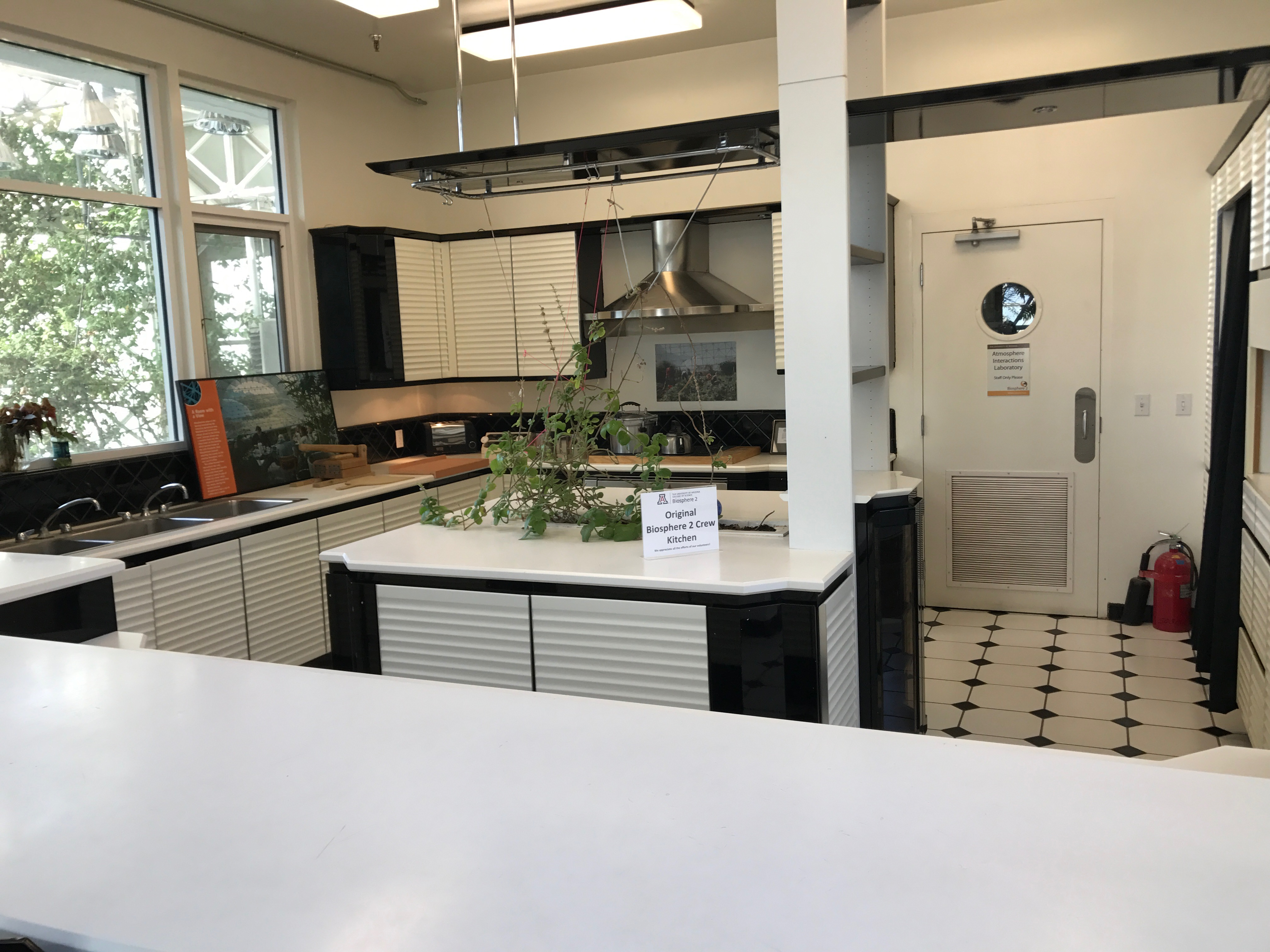
The crew's kitchen as it originally looked during the first mission

Much of the evidence for isolated human groups comes from psychological studies of scientists overwintering in Antarctic research stations. The study of this phenomenon is "confined environment psychology" (cf. environmental psychology); according to Jane Poynter, it was known to be a challenge and crews often split into factions.

Before the first closure mission was half over, the group had split into two factions and, according to Poynter, people who had been intimate friends had become implacable enemies, barely on speaking terms. "Appreciation of the value of biosphere interconnectedness and interdependency was appreciated as both an everyday beauty and a challenging reality," Walford later acknowledged, "I don't like some of them, but we were a hell of a team. That was the nature of the factionalism... but despite that, we ran the damn thing and we cooperated totally."

The factions inside the bubble formed from a rift and power struggle between the joint venture partners on how the science should proceed, as biospherics or as specialist ecosystem studies (perceived as reductionist). The faction that included Poynter felt strongly that increasing research should be prioritized over degree of closure. The other faction backed project management and the overall mission objectives. On February 14, a portion of the Scientific Advisory Committee (SAC) resigned. Time magazine wrote: "Now, the veneer of credibility, already bruised by allegations of tamper-prone data, secret food caches and smuggled supplies, has cracked ... the two-year experiment in self-sufficiency is starting to look less like science and more like a $150 million stunt." The SAC was dissolved because it had deviated from its mandate to review and improve scientific research and became involved in advocating management changes. Some SAC members chose to remain as consultants to Biosphere 2. The SAC's recommendations in their report were implemented including a new Director of Research Jack Corliss, allowing the import and export of scientific samples and equipment through the facility airlocks to increase research and decrease crew labor, and to generate the lacking formal research program. Some 64 projects were included in the research program that Walford and Alling spearheaded developing.

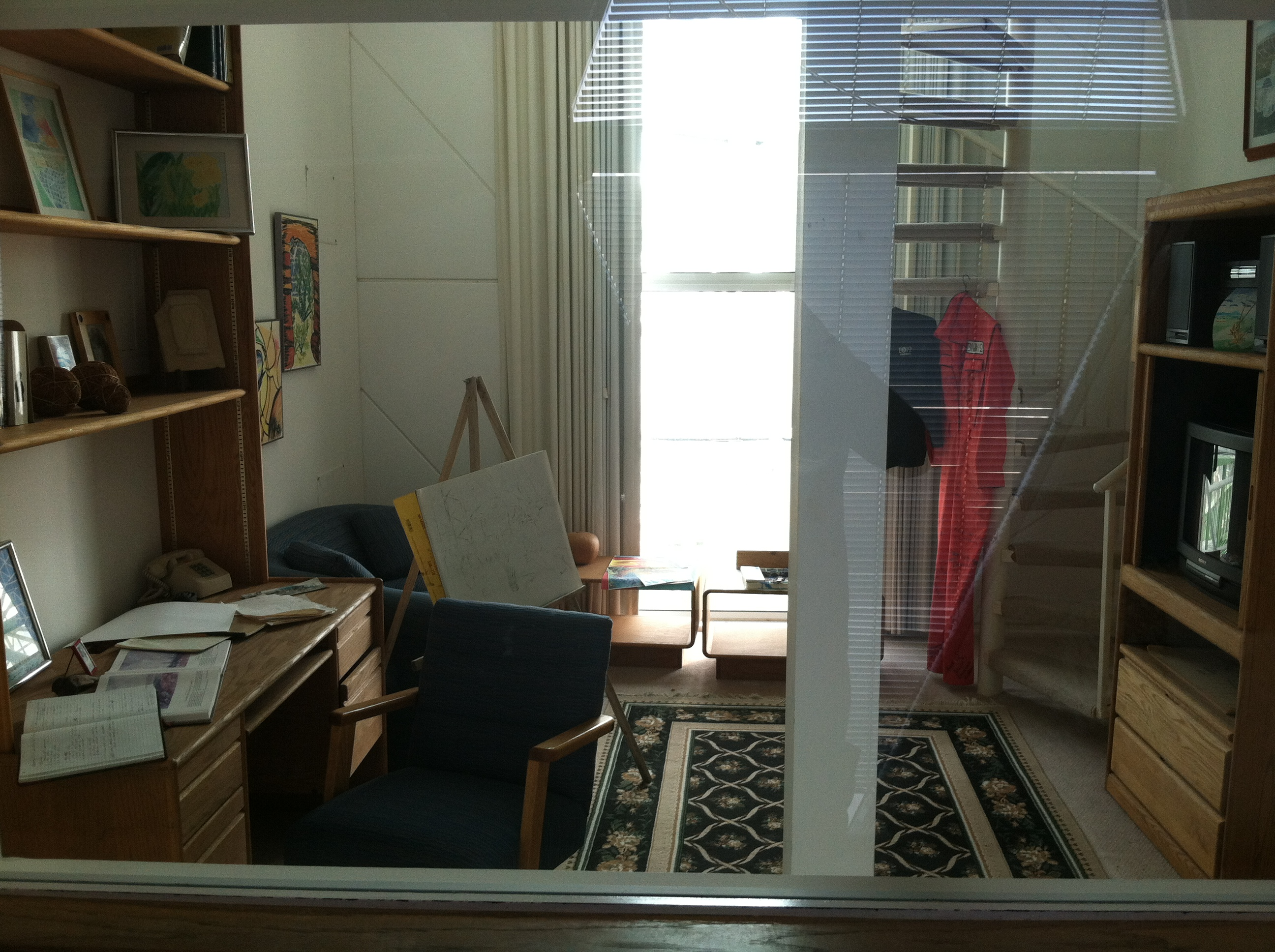
Residential area inside Biosphere 2

Undoubtedly the reduced oxygen and the calorie-restricted, nutrient-dense diet contributed to low morale. The Alling faction feared that the Poynter group were prepared to go so far as to import food, if it meant making them fitter to carry out research projects. They considered that would be a project failure by definition.

In November 1992, due to lack of produce, the Biospherians began eating seed stocks that had not been grown inside the Biosphere 2. Poynter made Chris Helms, PR Director for the enterprise, aware of this. She was promptly dismissed by Margret Augustine, CEO of Space Biospheres Ventures, and told to come out of the biosphere. This order was, however, never carried out. Poynter writes that she simply decided to stay put, correctly reasoning that the order could not be enforced without effectively terminating the closure.

Isolated groups tend to attach greater significance to group dynamic and personal emotional fluctuations common in all groups. Some reports from polar station crews exaggerated psychological problems. Although some of the first closure team thought they were depressed, psychological examination of the biospherians showed no depression and fit the explorer/adventurer profile, with scores very similar to those of astronauts.

=== Challenges ===
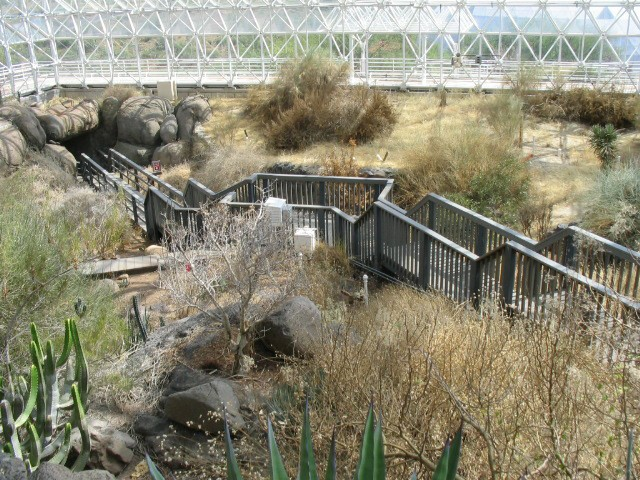
The fog desert biome of Biosphere 2 in 2005

Among the problems and miscalculations encountered in the first mission were unanticipated condensation making the "desert" too wet, population explosions of greenhouse ants and cockroaches, morning glories overgrowing the rainforest area blocking out other plants, and less sunlight (40–50% of outside light) entering the facility than originally anticipated. Biospherians intervened to control invasive plants when needed to preserve biodiversity, functioning as "keystone predators". In addition, construction itself was a challenge; for example, it was difficult to manipulate the bodies of water to have waves and tidal changes.

There was controversy when the public learned that the project had allowed an injured member to leave and return, carrying new material inside. The team claimed the only new supplies brought in were plastic bags, but others accused them of bringing food and other items. More criticism was raised when it was learned that, likewise, the project injected oxygen in January 1993 to make up for a failure in the balance of the system that resulted in the amount of oxygen steadily declining. Some thought that these criticisms ignored that Biosphere 2 was an experiment where the unexpected would occur, adding to knowledge of how complex ecologies develop and interact, not a demonstration where everything was known in advance. H. T. Odum noted: "The management process during 1992–1993 using data to develop theory, test it with simulation, and apply corrective actions was in the best scientific tradition. Yet some journalists crucified the management in the public press, treating the project as if it was an Olympic contest to see how much could be done without opening the doors".

The oxygen inside the facility, which began at 20.9%, fell at a steady pace and after 16 months was down to 14.5%. This is equivalent to the oxygen availability at an elevation of 4,080 meters (13,390 ft). Since some biospherians were starting to have symptoms like sleep apnea and fatigue, Walford and the medical team decided to boost oxygen with injections in January and August 1993. The oxygen decline and minimal response of the crew indicated that changes in air pressure are what trigger human adaptation responses. These studies enhanced the biomedical research program.

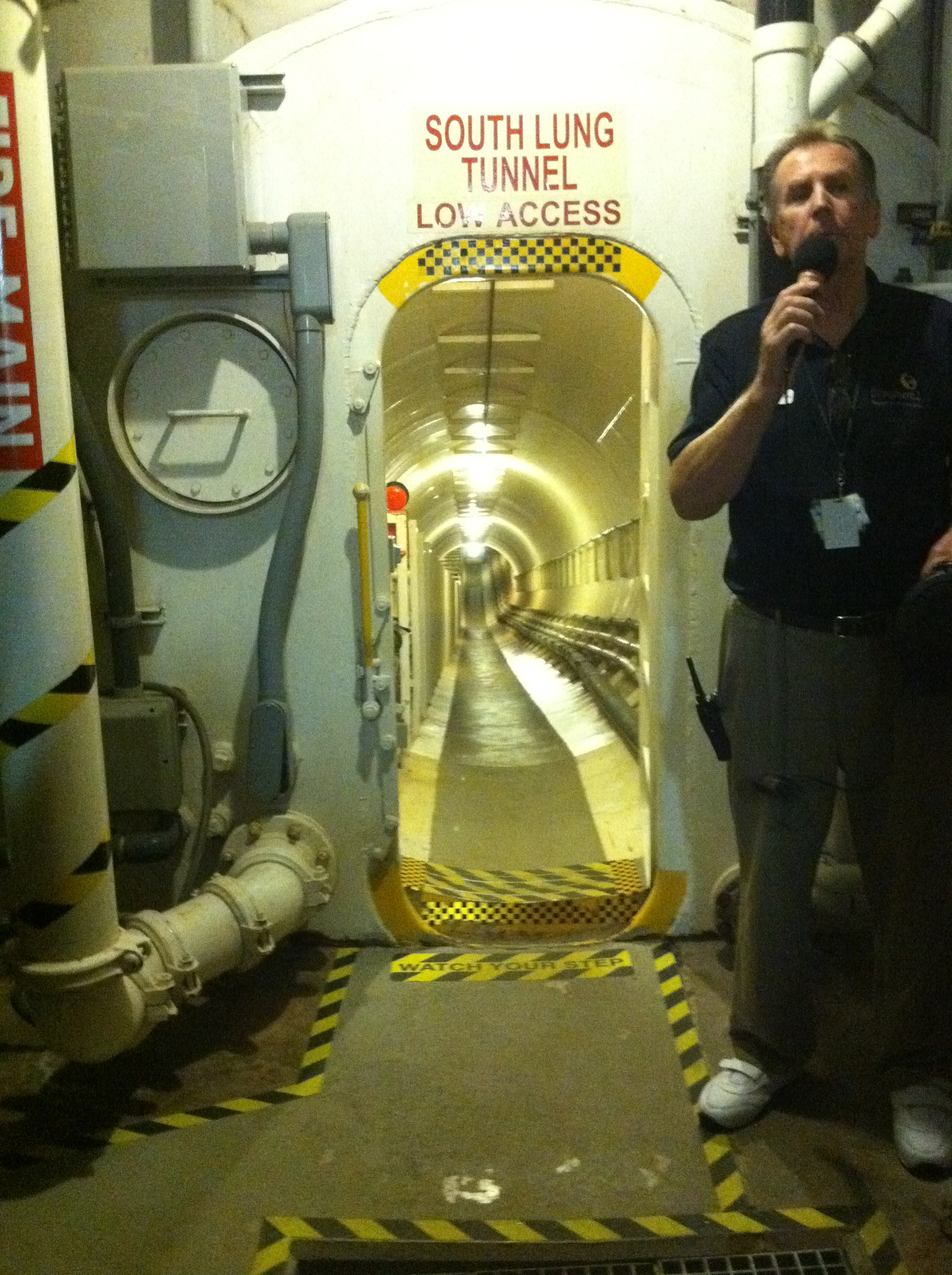
Tunnel access to South Lung

Managing CO_{2} levels was a particular challenge. Daily fluctuation of carbon dioxide dynamics was typically 600 ppm because of the strong drawdown during sunlight hours by plant photosynthesis, followed by a similar rise during the nighttime when system respiration dominated. As expected, there was also a strong seasonal signature to CO_{2} levels, with wintertime levels as high as 4,000–4,500 ppm and summertime levels near 1,000 ppm.

The crew worked to manage the CO_{2} by occasionally turning on a CO_{2} scrubber, after realizing that activating and de-activating the desert and savannah through control of irrigation water, cutting and storing biomass to sequester carbon, and utilizing all potential planting areas with fast-growing species to increase system photosynthesis, would not be enough to sustain human life. In November 1991, investigative reporting in The Village Voice alleged that the crew had secretly installed the CO_{2} scrubber device, and claimed that this violated Biosphere 2's advertised goal of recycling all materials naturally. Others pointed out there was nothing secret about the carbon dioxide device and it constituted another technical system augmenting ecological processes. The carbon precipitator could reverse the chemical reactions and thus release the stored carbon dioxide in later years when the facility might need additional carbon.

The soils were selected to have enough carbon to provide for the plants of the ecosystems to grow from infancy to maturity, a plant mass increase calculated to be 20 short tons (18,000 kg). The release rate of that soil carbon as carbon dioxide by respiration of soil microbes was an unknown that the Biosphere 2 experiment was designed to reveal. Subsequent research showed that Biosphere 2's farm soils had reached a more stable ratio of carbon and nitrogen, lowering the rate of CO_{2} release, by 1998.

The respiration rate was faster than the photosynthesis (possibly in part due to relatively low light penetration through the glazed structure and the fact that Biosphere 2 started with a small but rapidly increasing plant biomass) resulting in a slow decrease of oxygen. A mystery accompanied the oxygen decline: the corresponding increase in carbon dioxide did not appear. This concealed the underlying process until an investigation by Jeff Severinghaus and Wallace Broecker of Columbia University's Lamont–Doherty Earth Observatory using isotopic analysis showed that carbon dioxide was reacting with exposed concrete inside Biosphere 2 to form calcium carbonate in a process called carbonatation, thereby sequestering both carbon and oxygen.

=== Second mission (1994) ===
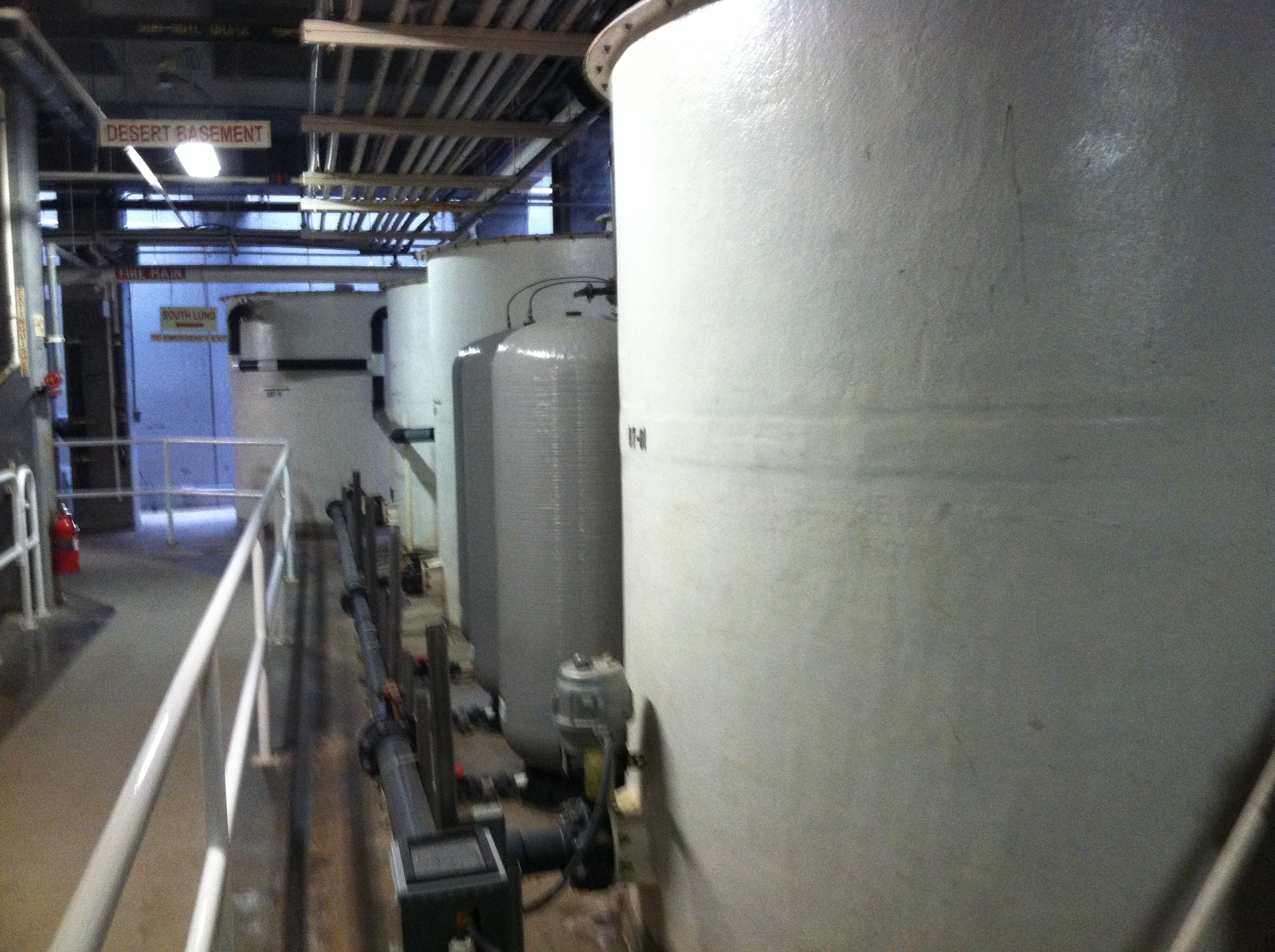
Reverse osmosis tanks in Biosphere 2 basement, also known as the technosphere

After Biosphere 2's first mission, extensive research and system improvements were undertaken, including sealing concrete to prevent the uptake of carbon dioxide. The second mission began on March 6, 1994, with an announced run of ten months. The crew was Norberto Alvarez-Romo (Capt.), John Druitt, Matt Finn, Pascale Maslin, Charlotte Godfrey, Rodrigo Romo and Tilak Mahato. The second crew achieved complete sufficiency in food production.

On April 1, 1994, a severe dispute within the management team led to the ousting of the on-site management by federal marshals serving a restraining order, and financier Ed Bass hired Steve Bannon, then-manager of the Bannon & Co. investment banking team from Beverly Hills, California, to run Space Biospheres Ventures. The project was put into receivership and an outside management team was installed for the receiver to turn around the floundering project. The reason for the dispute was threefold. Mismanagement of the mission had caused terrible publicity, financial mismanagement and lack of research. People alleged gross financial mismanagement of the project, leading to a loss of $25 million in fiscal year 1992. Some crew members and staff were concerned about Bannon, who had previously investigated cost overruns at the site; two former Biosphere 2 crew members flew back to Arizona to protest the hire and broke into the compound to warn the crew members that Bannon and the new management would jeopardize their safety.

At 3 a.m. on April 5, 1994, Abigail Alling and Mark Van Thillo, members of the first crew, allegedly vandalized the project from outside, opening one double-airlock door and three single door emergency exits, leaving them open for about 15 minutes. Five panes of glass were also broken. Alling later told the Chicago Tribune that she "considered the Biosphere to be in an emergency state ... In no way was it sabotage. It was my responsibility." About 10% of the Biosphere's air was exchanged with the outside during this time, according to systems analyst Donella Meadows, who received a communication from Alling saying that she and Van Thillo judged it their ethical duty to give those inside the choice of continuing with the drastically changed human experiment or leaving, as they didn't know what the crew had been told of the new situation. "On April 1, 1994, at approximately 10 AM ... limousines arrived on the biosphere site ... with two investment bankers hired by Mr. Bass ... They arrived with a temporary restraining order to take over direct control of the project ... With them were 6-8 police officers hired by the Bass organization ... They immediately changed locks on the offices ... All communication systems were changed (telephone and access codes), and [we] were prevented from receiving any data regarding safety, operations, and research of Biosphere 2." Alling emphasized several times in her letter that the "bankers" who suddenly took over "knew nothing technically or scientifically, and little about the biospherian crew".

Four days later, the captain Norberto Alvarez-Romo (by then married to Biosphere 2 chief executive Margaret Augustine) precipitously left the Biosphere for a "family emergency" after his wife's suspension. He was replaced by Bernd Zabel, who had been nominated as captain of the first mission but who was replaced at the last minute. Two months later, Matt Smith replaced Matt Finn.

The ownership and management company Space Biospheres Ventures was dissolved on June 1, 1994. This left the scientific and business management of the mission to the interim turnaround team, who had been contracted by the financial partner, Decisions Investment Co.

Mission 2 was ended prematurely on September 6, 1994. No further total system science has emerged from Biosphere 2 as the facility was changed by Columbia University from a closed ecological system to a "flow-through" system where CO_{2} could be manipulated at desired levels.

Steve Bannon left Biosphere 2 after two years, but his departure was marked by an "abuse of process" civil lawsuit filed against Space Biosphere Ventures by the former crew members who had broken in. Leading managers of Biosphere 2 from the original founding group stated both abusive behaviour by Bannon and others, and that the bankers' actual goal was to destroy the experiment. During a 1996 trial, Bannon testified that he had called one of the plaintiffs, Abigail Alling, a "self-centered, deluded young woman" and a "bimbo". He also testified that when the woman submitted a five-page complaint outlining safety problems at the site, he promised to shove the complaint "down her throat". Bannon attributed this to "hard feelings and broken dreams". At the end of the trial, the court ruled in favor of the plaintiffs and ordered Space Biosphere Ventures to pay them $600,000.

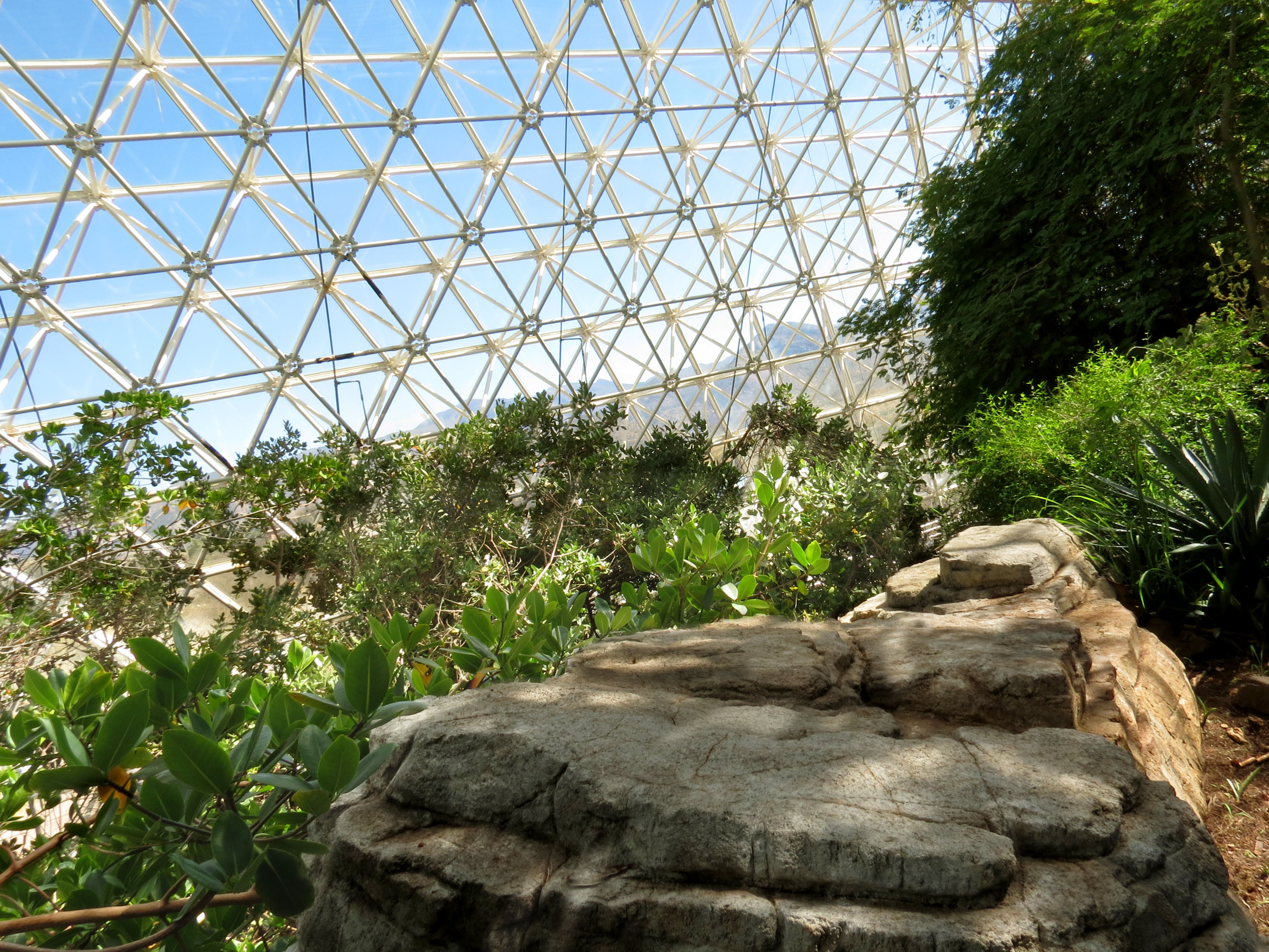
Mangrove wetlands biome inside Biosphere 2

A special issue of the Ecological Engineering journal edited by Marino and Howard T. Odum and published in 1999 as "Biosphere 2: Research Past and Present" represents the most comprehensive assemblage of collected papers and findings from Biosphere 2. The papers range from calibrated models that describe the system metabolism, hydrologic balance, and heat and humidity, to papers that describe rainforest, mangrove, ocean, and agronomic system development in this carbon dioxide-rich environment. Though several dissertations and many scientific papers used data from the early closure experiments at Biosphere 2, much of the original data has never been analyzed and is unavailable or lost, perhaps due to scientific politics and in-fighting.

Science historian Rebecca Redier has claimed that because Biosphere 2's creators were perceived as outsiders to academic science, the project was scrutinized but poorly understood in the media, and that this scrutiny ceased after Columbia University assumed management, because it was assumed they were "proper" scientists.

=== Praise and criticism ===
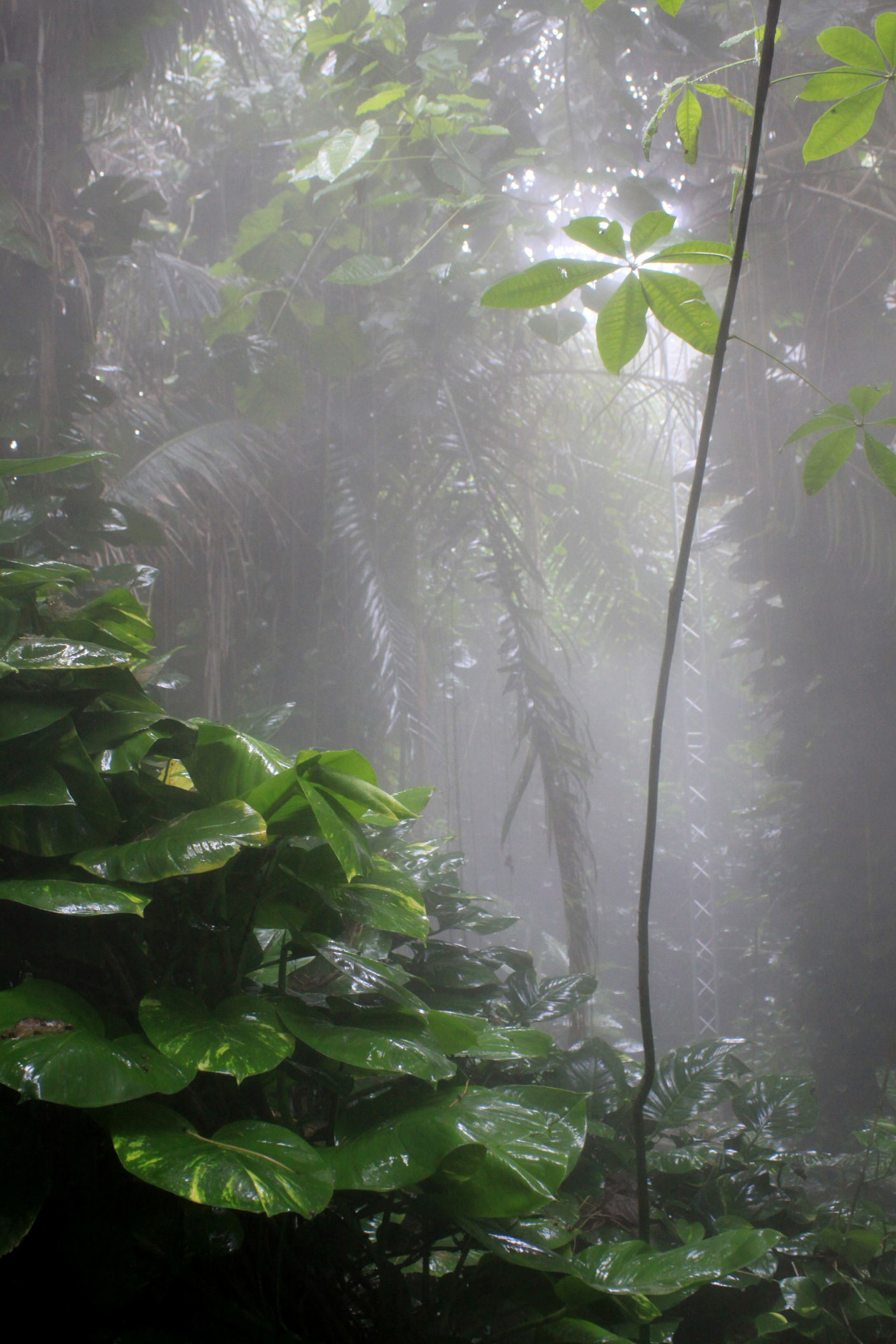
Inside the rainforest biome in Biosphere 2 in 2009

One view of Biosphere 2 was that it was "the most exciting scientific project to be undertaken in the United States since President John F. Kennedy launched us toward the moon". Others called it "New Age drivel masquerading as science". John Allen and Roy Walford did have mainstream credentials. John Allen held a degree in Metallurgical-Mining Engineering from the Colorado School of Mines, and an MBA from the Harvard Business School. Roy Walford received his doctorate of medicine from the University of Chicago and taught at UCLA as a professor of Pathology for 35 years. Mark Nelson obtained his Ph.D. in 1998 under Professor H.T. Odum in ecological engineering further developing the constructed wetlands used to treat and recycle sewage in Biosphere 2, to coral reef protection along the Yucatán coast where the corals were collected. Linda Leigh obtained her PhD with a dissertation on biodiversity and the Biosphere 2 rainforest working with Odum. Abigail Alling, Mark van Thillo and Sally Silverstone helped start the Biosphere Foundation where they worked on coral reef and marine conservation and sustainable agricultural systems. Jane Poynter and Taber MacCallum co-founded Paragon Space Development Corporation which has studied the first mini-closed system and the first full animal life cycle in space and assisted in setting world records in high altitude descents.

Questioning the credentials of the participants, Marc Cooper wrote in 1991 that "the group that built, conceived, and directs the Biosphere project is not a group of high-tech researchers on the cutting edge of science but a clique of recycled theater performers that evolved out of an authoritarian—and decidedly non-scientific—personality cult". He was referring to the Synergia Ranch in New Mexico, where indeed many of the Biospherians did practice theater under John Allen's leadership, and began to develop the ideas behind Biosphere 2. They also founded the Institute of Ecotechnics.

One of their own scientific consultants was critical early on. Ghillean Prance, director of the Royal Botanical Gardens in Kew, designed the rainforest biome inside the Biosphere. Although he later changed his opinion, acknowledging the unique scope of this experiment and contributed to its success as a consultant, in a 1983 interview (8 years before the start of the experiment), Prance said, "I was attracted to the Institute of Ecotechnics because funds for research were being cut and the institute seemed to have a lot of money which it was willing to spend freely. Along with others, I was ill-used. Their interest in science is not genuine. They seem to have some sort of secret agenda, they seem to be guided by some sort of religious or philosophical system." Prance went on in the 1991 newspaper interview to say "they are visionaries ... And maybe to fulfill their vision they have become somewhat cultlike. But they are not a cult, per se ... I am interested in ecological restoration systems. And I think all sorts of scientific things can come of this experiment, far beyond the space goal ... When they came to me with this new project, they seemed so well organized, so inspired, I simply decided to forget the past. You shouldn't hold their past against them."

Poynter in her memoir rebuts the critique that because some of the creative team of Biosphere 2 were not credentialed scientists, the results of the endeavor are invalid. "Some reporters hurled accusations that we were unscientific. Apparently because many of the SBV managers were not themselves degreed scientists, this called into question the entire validity of the project, even though some of the world's best scientists were working vigorously on the project's design and operation. The critique was not fair. Since leaving Biosphere 2, I have run a small business for ten years that sent experiments on the shuttle and to the space station, and is designing life support systems for the replacement shuttle and future moon base. I do not have a degree, not even an MBA from Harvard, as John [Allen] had. I hire scientists and top engineers. Our company's credibility is not called into question because of my credentials: we are judged on the quality of our work". H.T. Odum noted that mavericks and outsiders have often contributed to the development of science: "The original management of Biosphere 2 was regarded by many scientists as untrained for lack of scientific degrees, even though they had engaged in a preparatory study program for a decade, interacting with the international community of scientists including the Russians involved with closed systems. The history of science has many examples where people of atypical background open science in new directions, in this case implementing mesocosm organization and ecological engineering with fresh hypotheses".

In its report of August 1992, the Biosphere 2 Science Advisory Committee, chaired by Tom Lovejoy of the Smithsonian Institution, reported: "The committee is in agreement that the conception and construction of Biosphere 2 were acts of vision and courage. The scale of Biosphere 2 is unique and Biosphere 2 is already providing unexpected scientific results not possible through other means (notably the documented, unexpected decline in atmospheric oxygen levels.) Biosphere 2 will make important scientific contributions in the fields of biogeochemical cycling, the ecology of closed ecological systems, and restoration ecology." Columbia University assembled outside scientists to evaluate the potential of the facility after they took over management, and concluded the following: "A group of world-class scientists got together and decided the Biosphere 2 facility is an exceptional laboratory for addressing critical questions relative to the future of Earth and its environment."

=== Management by Columbia University (1995–2003) ===
In December 1995, the Biosphere 2 owners transferred management to Columbia University of New York City. Columbia ran Biosphere 2 as a research site and campus until 2003. Subsequently, management reverted to the owners.

In 1996, Columbia University changed the virtually airtight, materially closed structure designed for closed system research, to a "flow-through" system, and halted closed system research. They manipulated carbon dioxide levels for global warming research, and injected desired amounts of carbon dioxide, venting as needed. During Columbia's tenure, students from Columbia and other colleges and universities would often spend one semester at the site.

Research during Columbia's tenure demonstrated the devastating impacts on coral reefs from elevated atmospheric CO_{2} and acidification that will result from continued global climate change. Frank Press, former president of the National Academy of Sciences, described these interactions between atmosphere and ocean, taking advantage of the highly controllable ocean mesocosm of Biosphere 2, as the "first unequivocal experimental confirmation of the human impact on the planet".

Studies in Biosphere 2's terrestrial biomes showed that a saturation point was reached with elevated CO_{2} beyond which they are unable to uptake more. The studies' authors noted that the striking differences between the Biosphere 2 rainforest and desert biomes in their whole system responses "illustrates the importance of large-scale experimental research in the study of complex global change issues".

In January 2005, Decisions Investments Corporation, owner of Biosphere 2, announced that the project's 1,600-acre (650 ha) campus was for sale. They preferred a research use to be found for the complex but were not excluding buyers with different intentions, such as big universities, churches, resorts, and spas. In June 2007, the site was sold for $50 million to CDO Ranching & Development, L.P. 1,500 houses and a resort hotel were planned, but the main structure was still to be available for research and educational use.

=== Acquisition by University of Arizona (2007–present) ===
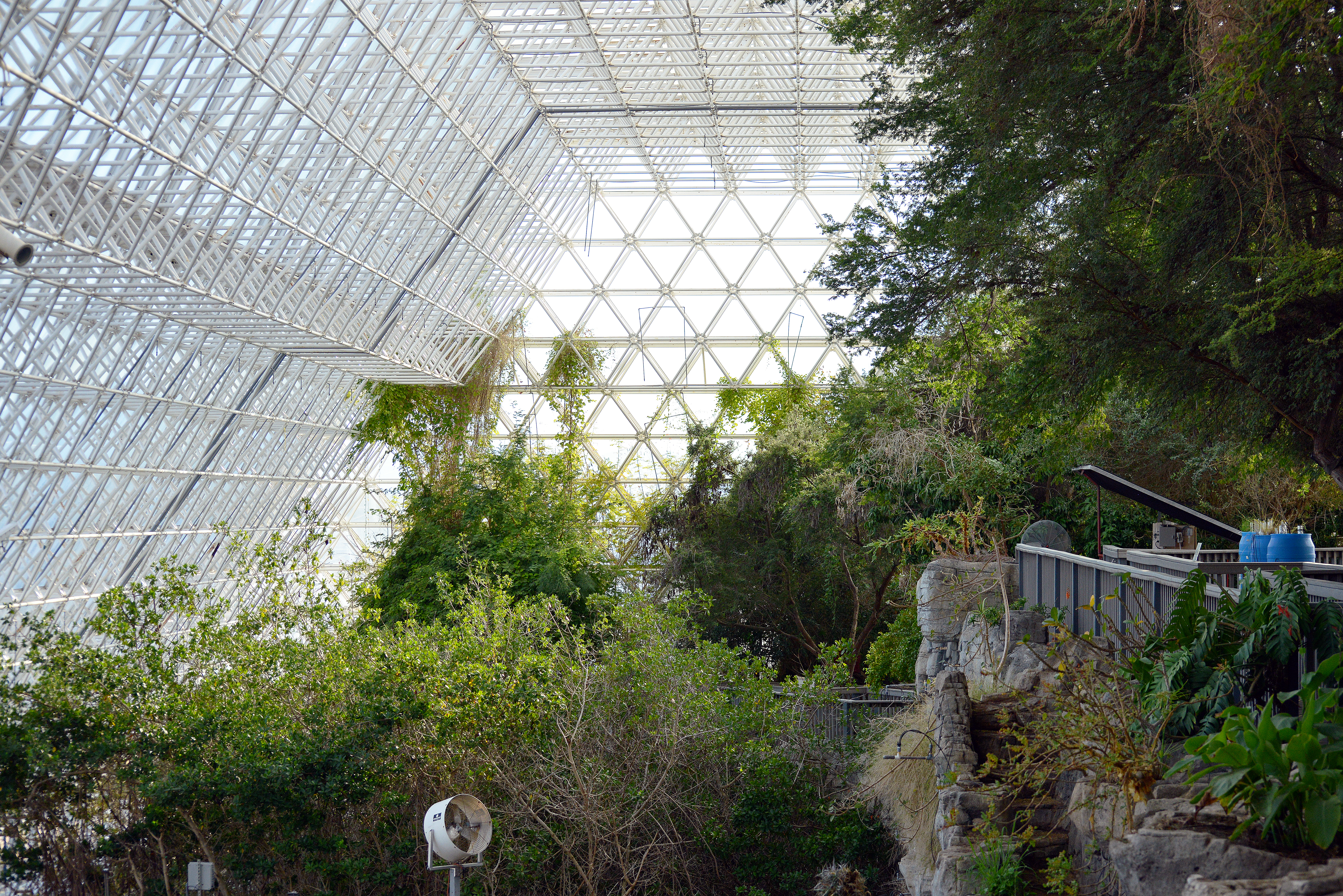
Inside Biosphere 2 in 2015 managed by the University of Arizona

On June 26, 2007, the University of Arizona announced it would take over research at the Biosphere 2. The announcement ended fears that the structure would be demolished. University officials said private gifts and grants enabled them to cover research and operating costs for three years with the possibility of extending funding for ten years. It was extended for ten years, and engaged in research projects including research into the terrestrial water cycle and how it relates to ecology, atmospheric science, soil geochemistry, and climate change. One of these gifts in 2009 included 470 photovoltaic solar panels added to the site. In June 2011, the university announced that it would assume full ownership of Biosphere 2, effective July 1.

CDO Ranching & Development donated the land, Biosphere buildings and several other support and administrative buildings. In 2011, the Philecology Foundation (a nonprofit research foundation founded by Ed Bass) pledged US$20 million for the ongoing science and operations. In 2017, Ed Bass donated another $30 million to the University of Arizona in support of Biosphere 2, endowing two academic positions and setting up the "Philecology Biospheric Research Endowment Fund".

Science camps are also held on the premises. These have included a week-long 'space camp' for university undergraduates, and overnight camps for school students. In 2011 it was reported that there were an average of 100,000 visitors per year visiting the Biosphere 2 campus.

=== Later research ===
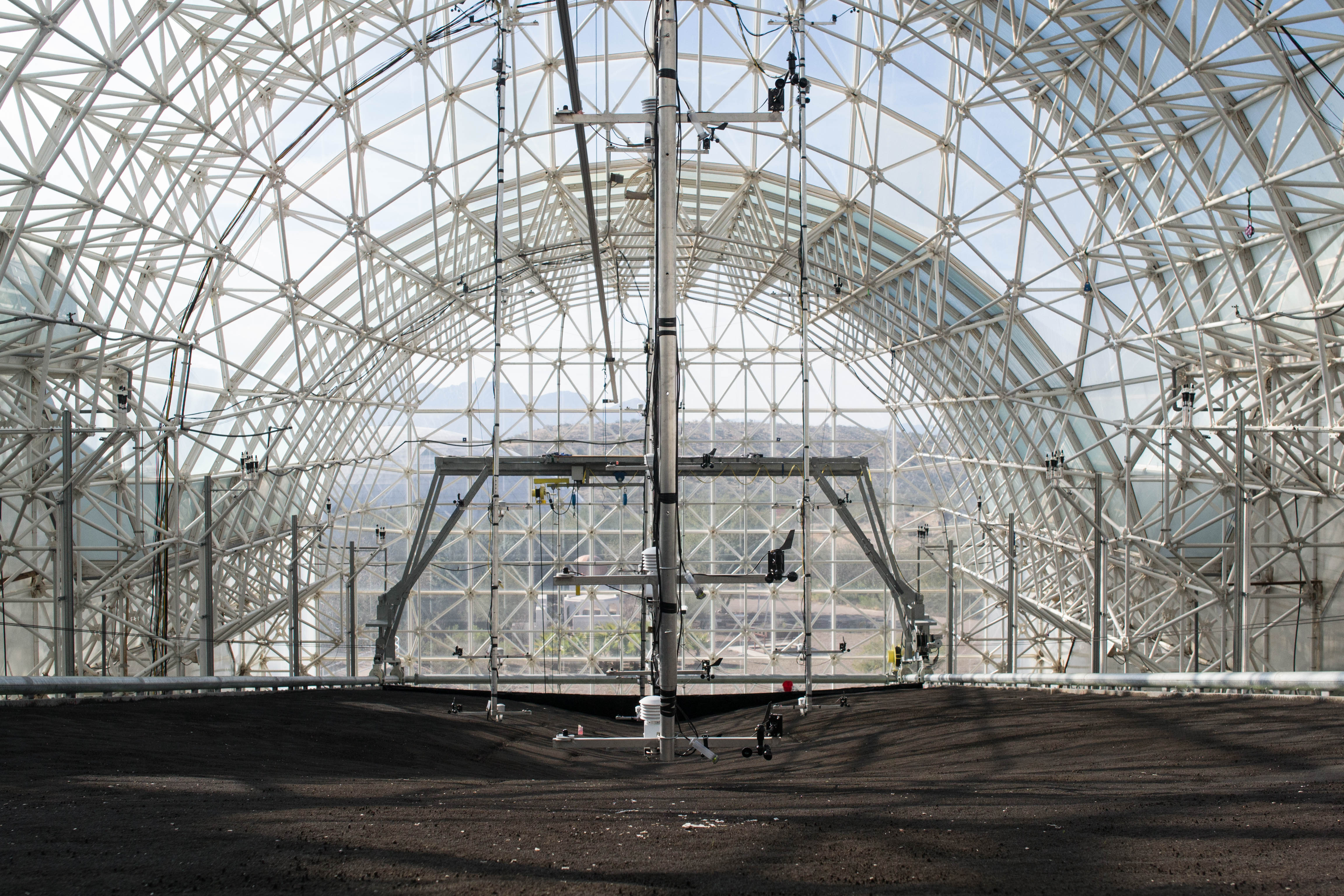
Landscape Evolution Observatory (LEO) at Biosphere 2, which is a 30 meter by 11 meter bed of crushed basalt rock extracted from a volcanic crater in northern Arizona focused on studying the evolution of soil

There are many small-scale research projects at Biosphere 2, as well as several large-scale research projects including:

- the Landscape Evolution Observatory (LEO), a project which uses 1,800 sensors to monitor millions of pounds of abiotic volcanic rock to track how this nonliving soil slowly develops over several years into a rich soil which is able to support microbial and vascular plant life. Structurally, this involved building three large steel-framed "hillsides" inside the pre-existing domes as the world's largest weighing lysimeter, with design and implementation construction constrained by the limited accessibility into the existing structure.
- the Lunar Greenhouse, a second prototype of the Controlled Environment Agriculture Center which seeks to understand how to grow vegetables on the Moon or Mars by developing a bioregenerative life support system which recycles and purifies water through plant transpiration.
- a vertical farming project to be built in Biosphere 2's west lung, in collaboration with the private company Civic Farms, in an effort to develop an indoor plant growth cycle with LED lamps configured to specific wavelengths aimed at increasing water efficiency, producing zero farm runoff, with no pests or pesticides, and zero effect from external weather conditions.
- the Space Analog for the Moon and Mars, a sealed research habitat repurposed from the Biosphere 2's Test Module to study human in the loop technology such as bioregenerative life support systems.

== In popular culture ==
- Bio-Dome, a 1996 comedy film based on Biosphere 2
- The Terranauts, a 2016 novel based on Biosphere 2
- Spaceship Earth, a 2020 documentary film on Biosphere 2
- MrBeast: "$1 vs $1000000000 Futuristic Tech!", a 2026 YouTube video of a visit to Biosphere 2, highlighting futuristic technology

== See also ==
- BIOS-3 – Closed ecosystem at the Institute of Biophysics in Krasnoyarsk, Russia
- Eden Project – Visitor attraction in Cornwall, England
- IBTS Greenhouse – Egyptian desalination project
- Institute of Ecotechnics – Educational, training, and research charity
- Mars analog habitat – Research simulating the environment on Mars:
  - Flashline Mars Arctic Research Station – Simulated Mars habitat on Devon Island, Nunavut, Canada
  - Mars Desert Research Station – Longest-running Mars analog habitat
  - MARS-500 – Psychosocial isolation experiment in spaceflight research
  - HI-SEAS – Analog habitat for human spaceflight to Mars
- MELiSSA – European Space Agency led consortium developing life support systems for space missions
- Yuegong-1 – Chinese research facility for developing a Moon base
