= Steve Kozlowski =

American psychologist (born 1952)

Steve W.J. Kozlowski (born 1952) is an American Industrial-Organizational psychologist. His research mainly focuses on how individuals, teams and organizations learn, develop and adapt. He currently teaches at University of South Florida.

== Career ==
Steve Kozlowski was born in Rhode Island in 1952. He earned his B.A. in psychology from the University of Rhode Island in December 1976. He went on to earn his M.S. in I/O psychology from The Pennsylvania State University in 1979, followed by his Ph.D. in the same area in 1982.

Kozlowski became an assistant professor in the I/O psychology program at Michigan State University soon after graduating in 1982. He became an associate professor in 1987 and a full professor in 1994. He was the editor of the Journal of Applied Psychology for the 2009–2014 term and was elected president of the Society for Industrial and Organizational Psychology in 2013.
