= Spaceship Earth (film) =

2020 American documentary film

- Promotional poster
- Directed by: Matt Wolf
- Produced by: Matt Wolf; Stacey Reiss
- Cinematography: Sam Wootton
- Edited by: David Teague
- Music by: Owen Pallett
- Production companies: Impact Partners; RadicalMedia
- Distributed by: Neon
- Release dates: January 26, 2020 (Sundance); May 8, 2020 (United States)
- Running time: 115 minutes
- Country: United States
- Language: English

Spaceship Earth is a 2020 American documentary film directed by Matt Wolf about the 1991 experiment that saw eight individuals spend two years quarantined inside of a self-engineered replica of Earth's ecosystem, dubbed Biosphere 2. The film premiered at the Sundance Film Festival on January 26, 2020, and was released in the United States on May 8, 2020, by Neon.

== Premise ==
Using archived footage and present-day interviews, the film follows the large dome that featured a replica of earth's ecosystem called Biosphere 2, constructed in the Arizona desert. Trying to see if it is possible to establish human existence on other planets, eight "biospherians" go to live inside the vivarium, where they face ecological issues and accusations of cult-mentalities.

== Reception ==
On review aggregator website Rotten Tomatoes the film holds an approval rating of 88% based on 112 reviews, with an average rating of 7/10. The site's critics consensus reads: "Spaceship Earth achieves liftoff as an engaging behind-the-scenes record of an audacious experiment -- and settles into orbit as poignant proof of the power of a shared dream." Metacritic assigned the film an average weighted score of 73 out of 100, based on 26 critics, indicating "generally favorable reviews".

John DeFore of The Hollywood Reporter wrote: "Using both present-tense interviews and footage from the time, Wolf shows how things nearly fell apart. But he also captures the seriousness of purpose behind what some saw as a giant publicity stunt — and convinces us that this was a one-of-a-kind way to learn some of the things humanity will need to know as this world changes and others are considered for habitation."

Kate Knibbs, in Wired, wrote that director Matt Wolf's "soft-focus emphasis on the bonhomie of the Synergians" was unexpectedly touching. The review calls the film a credulous portrayal while having an incomplete narrative, omitting incidents of interpersonal drama and gliding over what transpired following the first round of the experiment. Steve Bannon, who took over Biosphere 2 in 1993, only appears in the final 15 minutes of the film despite causing the resignation of the original Biospherians and filing criminal charges against Abigail Alling and Mark Van Thillo after they broke into the enclosure to warn the second group about him.
