= Life Sciences in Space Research =

- Discipline: Astrobiology, space medicine, space biology
- Language: English
- Edited by: Tom Hei

Publication details
- History: 2014–present
- Publisher: Elsevier
- Frequency: Quarterly
- Impact factor: 2.082 (2020)

Standard abbreviations
- ISO 4: Life Sci. Space Res.

Indexing
- ISSN: 2214-5524
- LCCN: 2015243338
- OCLC no.: 881179832

Links
- Journal homepage; Online archive

Life Sciences in Space Research is a quarterly peer-reviewed scientific journal covering astrobiology, origins of life, life in extreme environments, habitability, effects of spaceflight on the human body, radiation risks, and other aspects of life sciences relevant in space research. It was established in 2014 and is published by Elsevier. It is an official journal of the Committee on Space Research (COSPAR), publishing papers in the areas that were previously covered by the Life Sciences section of Advances in Space Research, another official journal of COSPAR. The editor-in-chief is Tom Hei (Columbia University Medical Center).

== Abstracting and indexing ==
The journal is abstracted and indexed in the Emerging Sources Citation Index, Index Medicus/MEDLINE/PubMed, and Scopus.
