= Bois-le-Roi, Seine-et-Marne =

Bois-le-Roi
- Commune
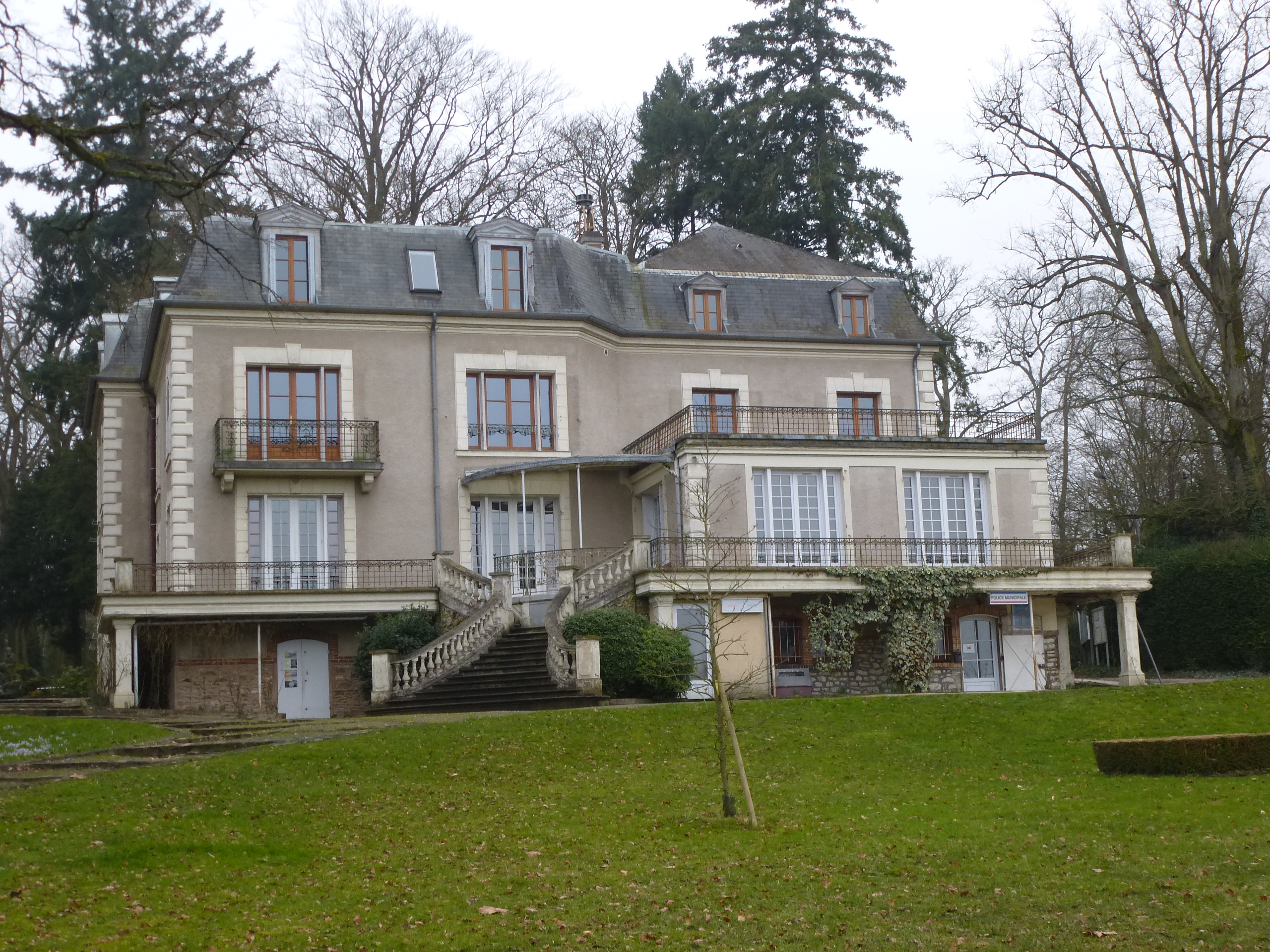
- The town hall in Bois-le-Roi

- Coat of arms
- Location of Bois-le-Roi
- Location within France Location within Île-de-France (region)
- Coordinates: 48°28′27″N 2°41′54″E
- Country: France
- Region: Île-de-France
- Department: Seine-et-Marne
- Arrondissement: Fontainebleau
- Canton: Nangis
- Intercommunality: CA Pays de Fontainebleau

Government
  - Mayor (2020–2026): David Dintilhac
- Area^{1}: 6.96 km^{2} (2.69 sq mi)
- Highest elevation: 91 m (299 ft)
- Lowest elevation: 38 m (125 ft)
- Population (2023): 6,072
  - Density: 872/km^{2} (2,260/sq mi)
- Demonym: Bacots
- Time zone: UTC+01:00 (CET)
  - Summer (DST): UTC+02:00 (CEST)
- INSEE/Postal code: 77037 /77590
- Website: ville-boisleroi.fr
- ^{1} French Land Register data, which excludes lakes, ponds, glaciers > 1 km^{2} (0.386 sq mi or 247 acres) and river estuaries.

Bois-le-Roi (French pronunciation: [bwa l(ə) ʁwa]; lit. 'Wood-the-King') is a commune in the Seine-et-Marne department in the Île-de-France region in north-central France. It is between Melun and Fontainebleau, on the left bank of the Seine. It shares two bridges with the neighbouring Chartrettes to the north.

== Tourism ==
Many Parisians usually go to explore Bois-le-Roi during the holidays. Popular destinations include the Église Saint-Pierre, a small church, the Ô de Sermaize, a wellness spa, as well as the Île de Loisirs de Bois-le-Roi, a beach on the Seine.

== Demographics ==
The inhabitants are called Bacots (masculine) and Bacottes (feminine) in French.

Historical population
Year	Pop.	±% p.a.
1968	2,782	—
1975	3,044	+1.29%
1982	3,395	+1.57%
1990	4,744	+4.27%
1999	5,292	+1.22%
2007	5,452	+0.37%
2012	5,649	+0.71%
2017	5,876	+0.79%
2023	6,072	+0.55%
Source: INSEE

== Transport ==
Bois-le-Roi is served by Bois-le-Roi station on Transilien Line R (from Paris-Gare de Lyon).

== See also ==
- Communes of the Seine-et-Marne department
