= Bois-le-Roi station =

Railway station in Bois-le-Roi, France

Bois-le-Roi
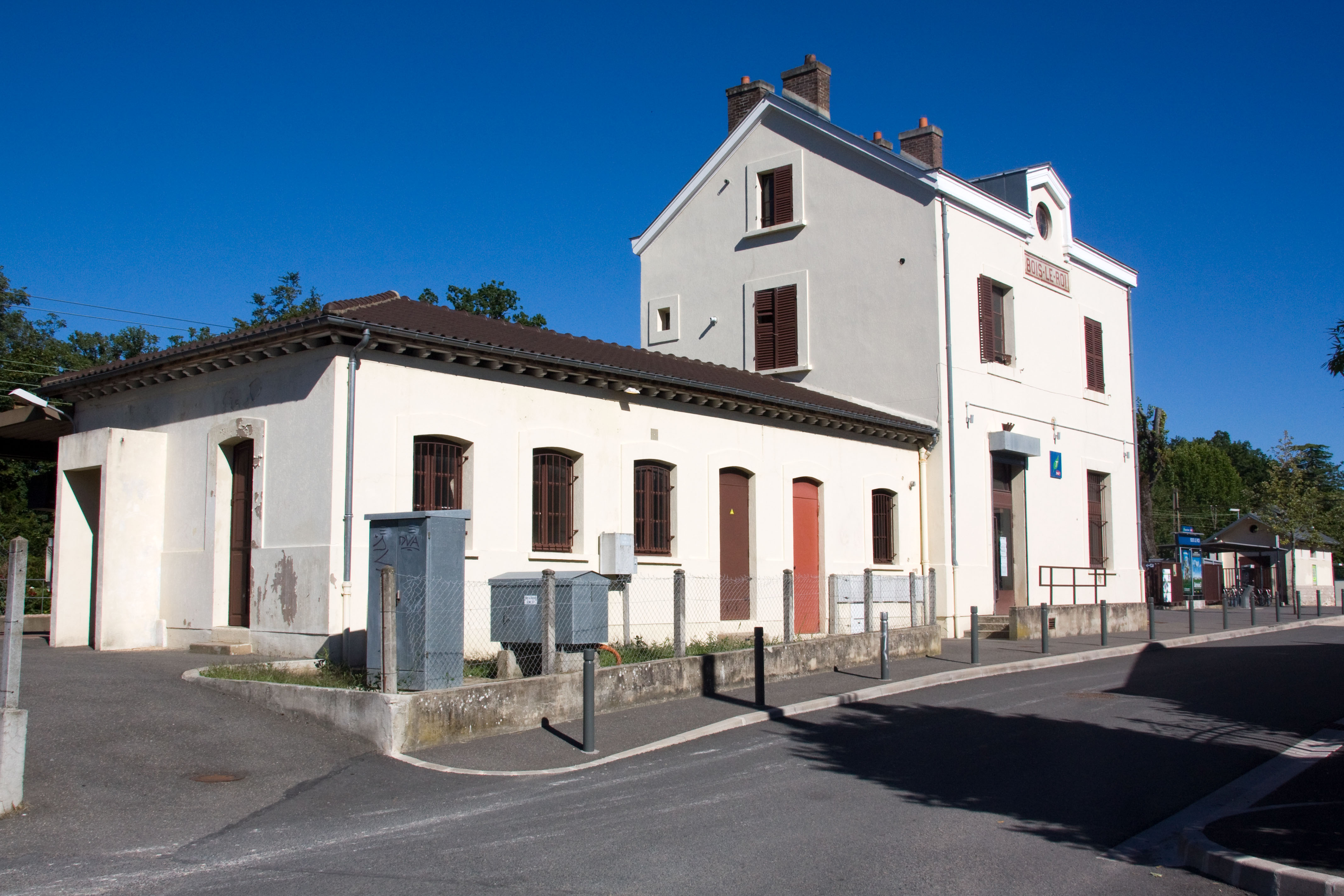
- Bois-le-Roi station

General information
- Location: Rue de la Gare; 77590 Bois-le-Roi; Seine-et-Marne, France
- Coordinates: 48°28′32″N 2°41′31″E
- Elevation: 78 m
- Line: Paris–Marseille railway
- Platforms: 2
- Tracks: 2
- Connections: Fontainebleau – Moret: 3440 3444 3445 3447; Noctilien: N137

Other information
- Station code: 87682203
- Fare zone: 5

History
- Opened: 3 January 1849

Passengers
- 2024: 1,560,861

Services
Preceding station	Transilien	Following station
Melun towards Paris-Lyon	Line R	Fontainebleau–Avon towards Montargis or Montereau
Melun towards Paris-Lyon	Line R	Fontainebleau-Forêt limited service towards Montereau
Preceding station	TER Bourgogne-Franche-Comté	Following station
Melun towards Paris-Lyon	TER	Fontainebleau–Avon towards Laroche-Migennes
Location

Bois-le-Roi (French pronunciation: [bwa l(ə) ʁwa]; French: Gare de Bois-le-Roi) is a railway station in Bois-le-Roi, Île-de-France, France. The station is at kilometric point (KP) 50.896 on the Paris–Marseille railway.

The station is served by Transilien Line R (from Paris-Gare de Lyon) and TER Bourgogne-Franche-Comté services operated by the SNCF. The station was designed by the architect François-Alexis Cendrier, one of many he worked on for the railroad company Chemins de fer de Paris à Lyon et à la Méditerranée.

== Train services ==
The following services currently call at Bois-le-Roi:

- local service (TER Bourgogne-Franche-Comté) Paris–Montereau–Sens–Laroche-Migennes
- local service (Transilien R) Paris–Melun–Montereau
- local service (Transilien R) Paris–Melun–Montargis

== Gallery ==
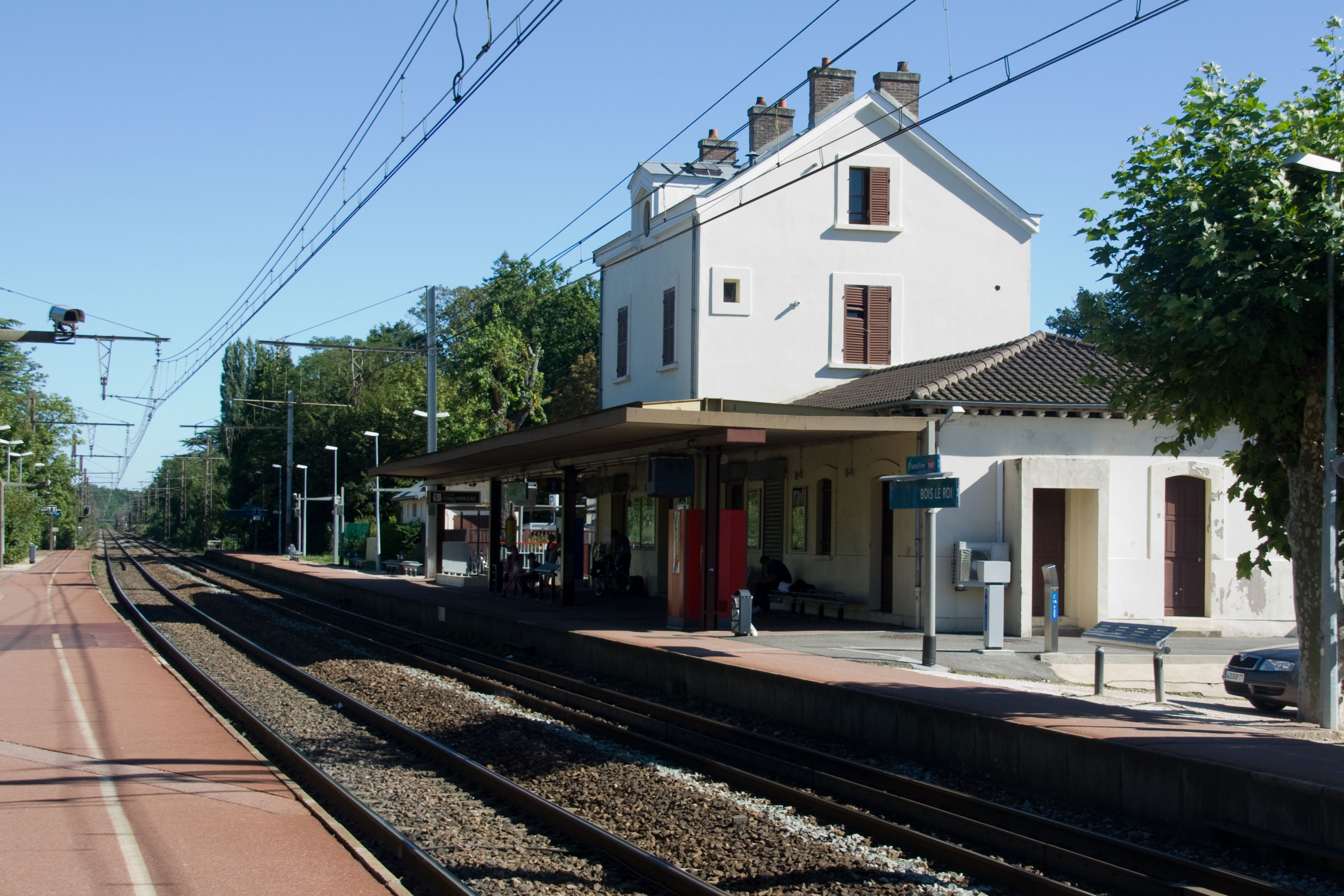
The station

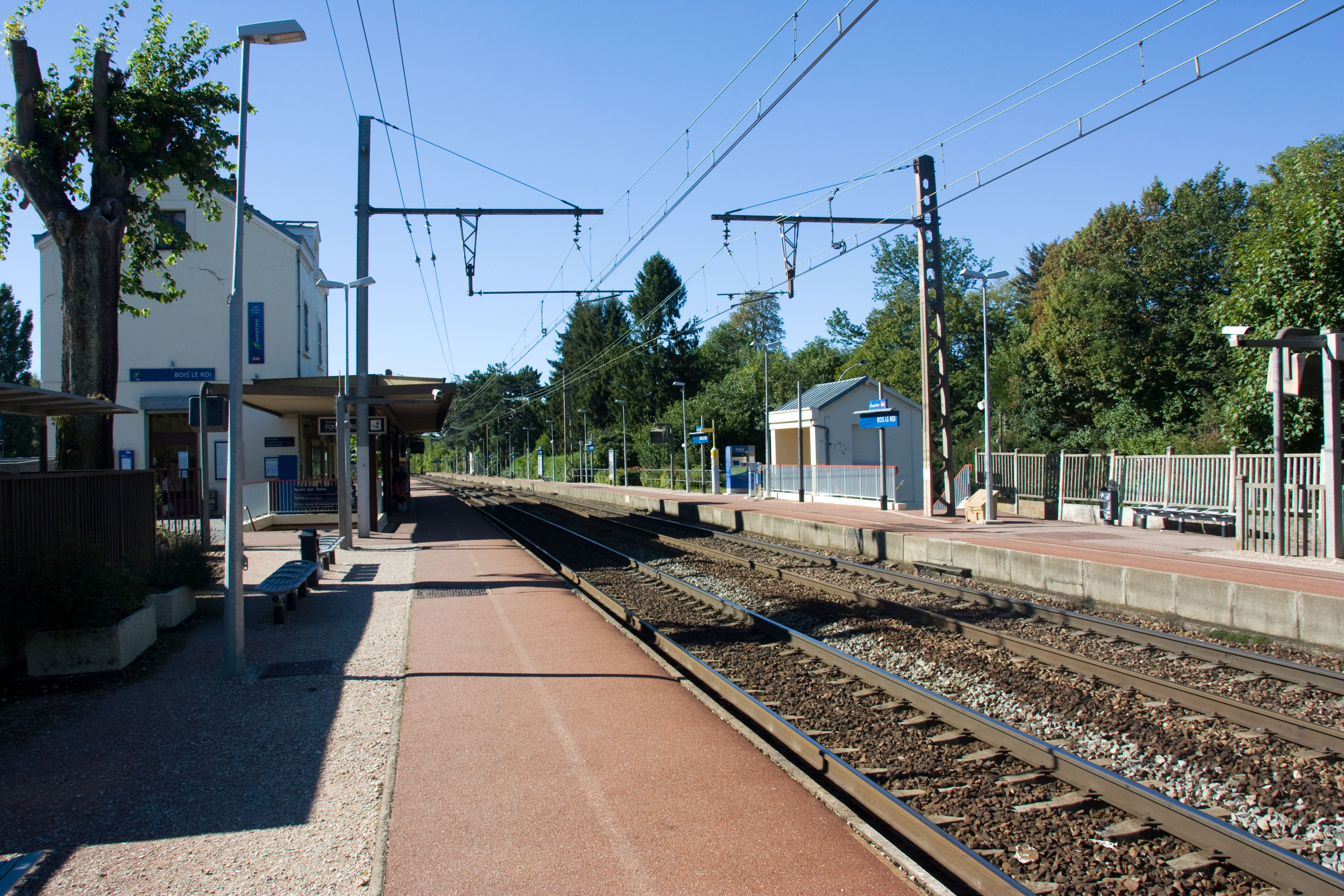
The station

A BB 26000 pulling Corail trains passing the station, while a Z 57000 from Transilien R arrives.

Another BB 26000 pulling Corail trains passing the station.

== See also ==
- Transilien Paris–Lyon
