= Edme-Louis Daubenton =

French naturalist

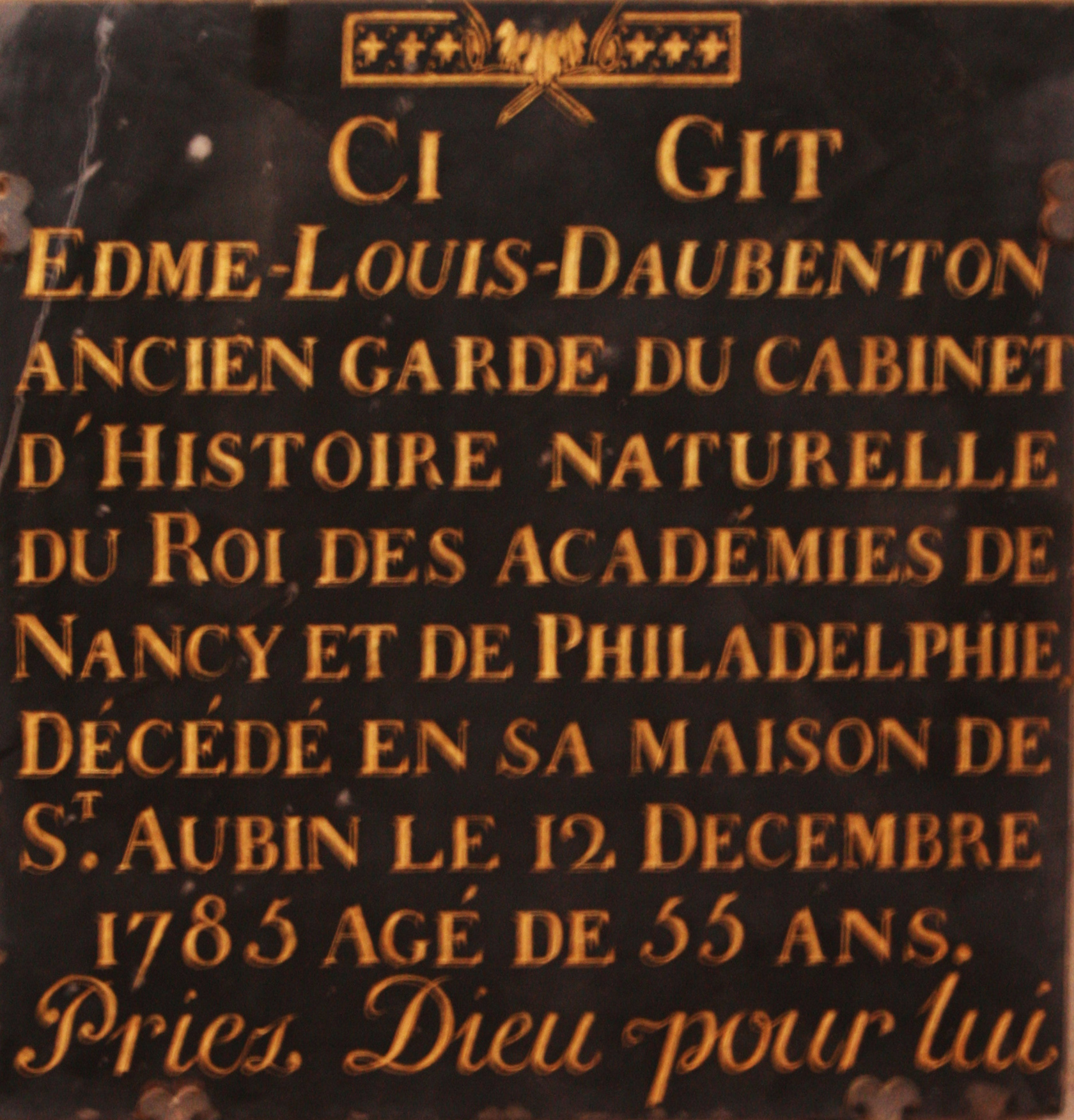
Tombstone in the church of Saint-Pierre in Avon

Edme-Louis Daubenton (12 August 1730 – 12 December 1785) was a French naturalist.

Daubenton was the cousin of another French naturalist, Louis Jean-Marie Daubenton. Georges-Louis Leclerc, the Comte de Buffon engaged Edme-Louis Daubenton to supervise the coloured illustrations for the monumental Histoire Naturelle (1749–89). The Planches enluminées started to appear in 1765 and finally counted 1,008 plates, all engraved by François-Nicolas Martinet (1731–1800), and all painted by hand. The Parisian publisher Panckoucke published a version without text between 1765 and 1783. More than 80 artists took part in the realization of the original paintings. 973 plates relate to birds; others illustrate especially butterflies but also other insects, corals, etc. The illustrations were not very successful, but they allow a rather good determination of the species illustrated, some of them now extinct. As Buffon did not follow the system of biological nomenclature developed by Carl von Linné in 1783, Pieter Boddaert (1730–1796) published a table of the correspondence of the names used with their Linnean binomial names.

Edme-Louis Daubenton's tombstone is in the church of Saint-Pierre in Avon, Seine-et-Marne.

== Publications ==
- Daubenton, Edme-Louis (1765–1783). Planches enluminées d'histoire naturelle. Vol. 1–10. Martinet, François Nicolas (engraver). Paris. doi:10.5962/bhl.title.51460.
