= Anglès (surname) =

Anglès is a surname. Notable people with the surname include:

- Jules Anglès (1778–1828), French politician
- Pep Anglès (born 1993), Spanish golfer
- Raoul Anglès (1887–1967), French politician
