= Moret–Veneux-les-Sablons station =

Railway station in Veneux-les-Sablons, France

Moret Veneux-les-Sablons
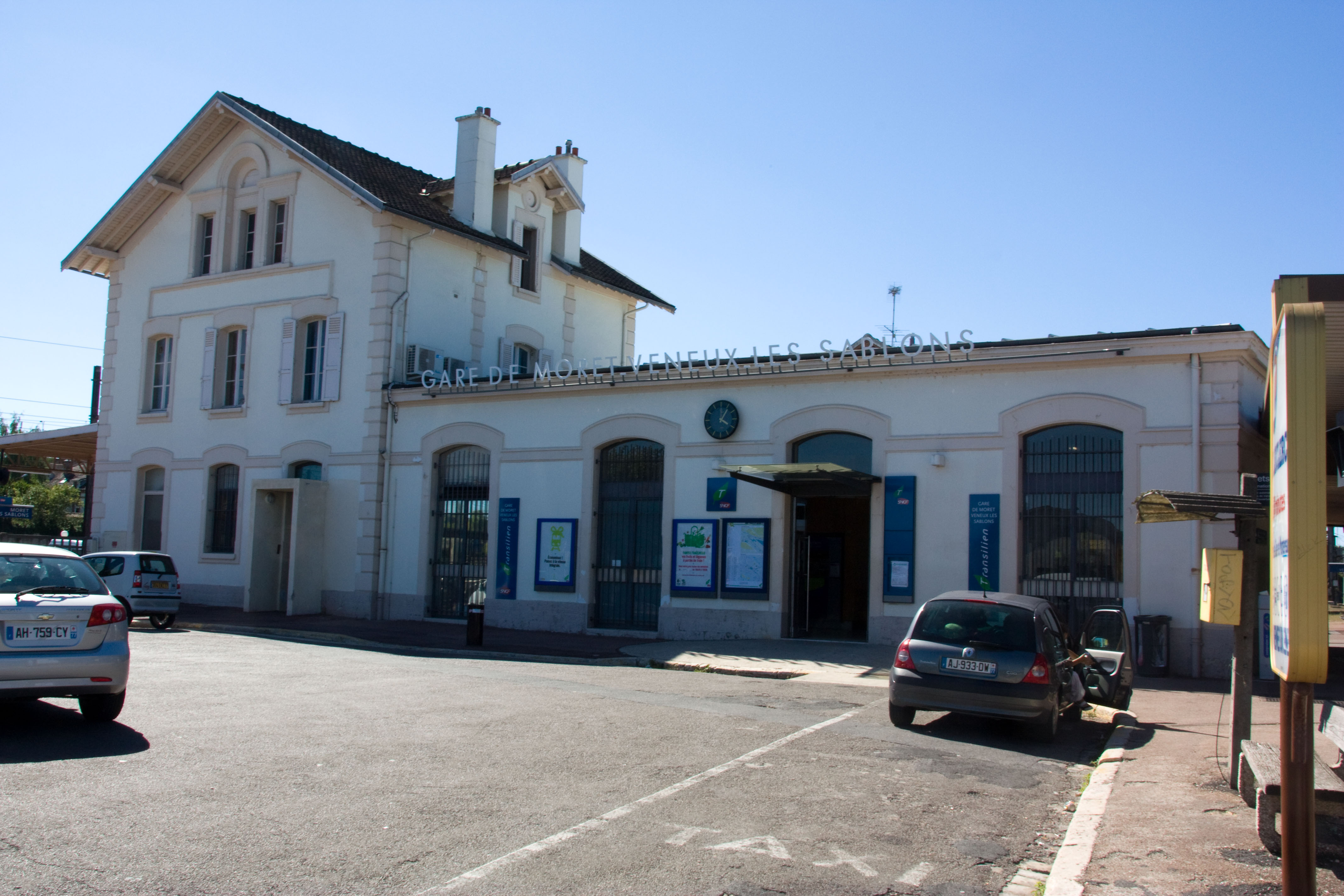
- Gare de Moret–Veneux-les-Sablons

General information
- Location: Veneux-les-Sablons, Seine-et-Marne, Île-de-France, France
- Coordinates: 48°22′42″N 2°47′58″E
- Lines: Paris–Marseille railway, Moret–Lyon railway
- Platforms: 5
- Tracks: 6 (1L, 2L, 1N, 2N, A, B)
- Connections: Fontainebleau – Moret: 3433 3434 3435 3436 3437 3438; Vallée du Loing - Nemours: 3535; Noctilien: N137

Other information
- Station code: 87682278
- Fare zone: 5

History
- Opened: 1858

Passengers
- 2024: 1,516,716

Services
Preceding station	Transilien	Following station
Thomery towards Paris-Lyon	Line R	Montigny-sur-Loing towards Montargis
Thomery towards Paris-Lyon	Line R	Saint-Mammès towards Montereau

Other services
Preceding station	TER Bourgogne-Franche-Comté	Following station
Fontainebleau-Avon towards Paris-Lyon	TER	Saint-Mammès towards Laroche-Migennes
Location

Moret–Veneux-les-Sablons is a railway station in Veneux-les-Sablons and Moret-sur-Loing, Île-de-France, France. It is on the Paris–Marseille railway, and at the beginning of a branch line to Nevers and Clermont-Ferrand.

== The station ==
The station opened in 1858 and is on the Paris–Marseille and Moret–Lyon railway lines. The station is served by Intercités (long distance) and TER (local) services operated by SNCF. The station is served by Transilien line R (Paris-Gare de Lyon).

The first station of Moret opened when the lines to Dijon and Marseille were constructed, in 1851 and 1856 respectively, the local station, named Moret–Saint-Mammès, was in Saint-Mammès. The Moret–Les Sablons station was built in 1858 as part of the Bourbonnais-line, which ran to Clermont-Ferrand.

The station was designed by the architect François-Alexis Cendrier, one of many he worked on for the railroad company Chemins de fer de Paris à Lyon et à la Méditerranée.

On the Nevers branch there is a small siding, where some trains are stabled.

== Train services ==
The following services call at Moret-Veneux-les-Sablons as of 2022:

- local service (TER Bourgogne-Franche-Comté) Paris–Montereau–Sens–Laroche-Migennes
- local service (Transilien R) Paris–Melun–Montereau
- local service (Transilien R) Paris–Melun–Nemours–Montargis

== Gallery ==
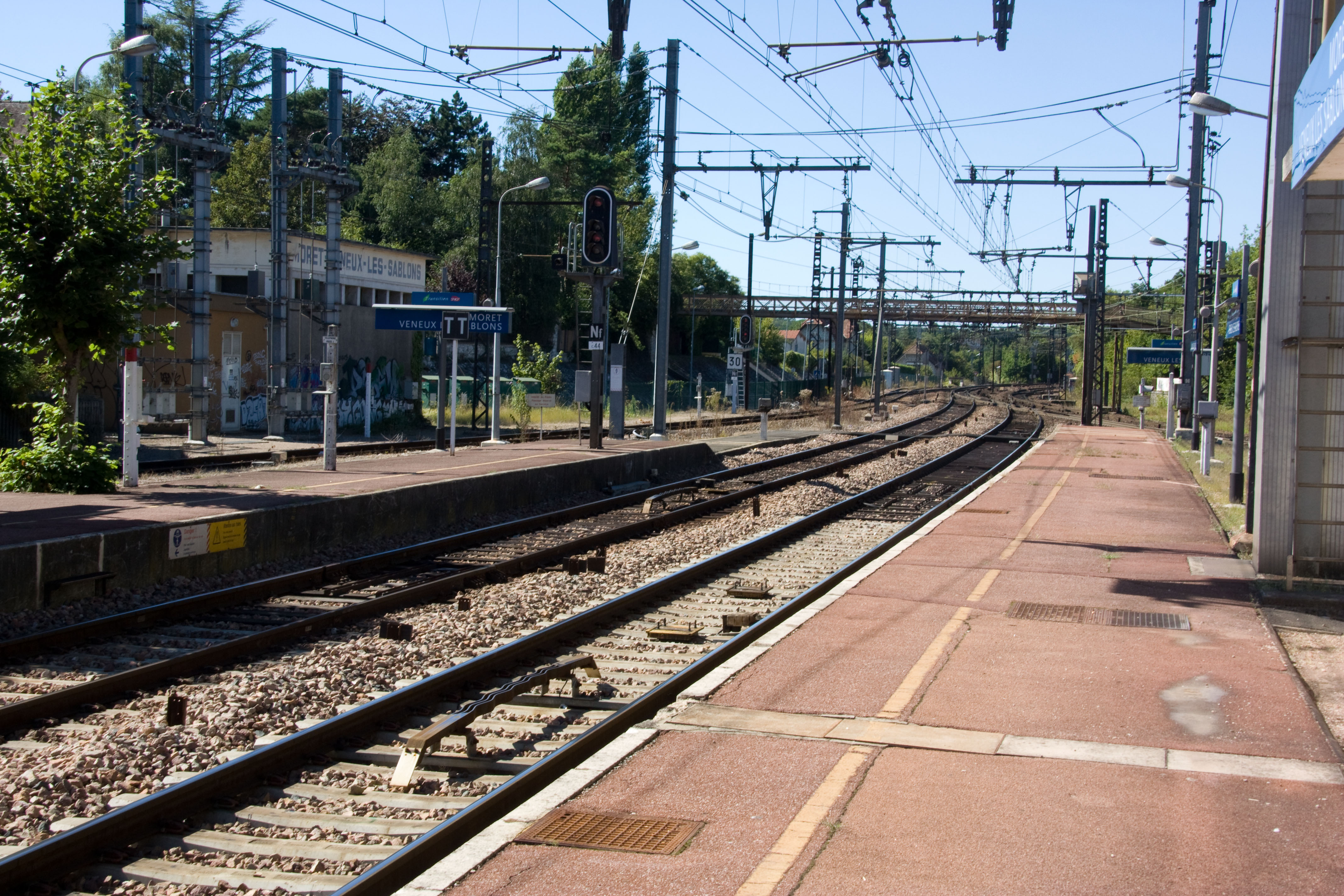
The station

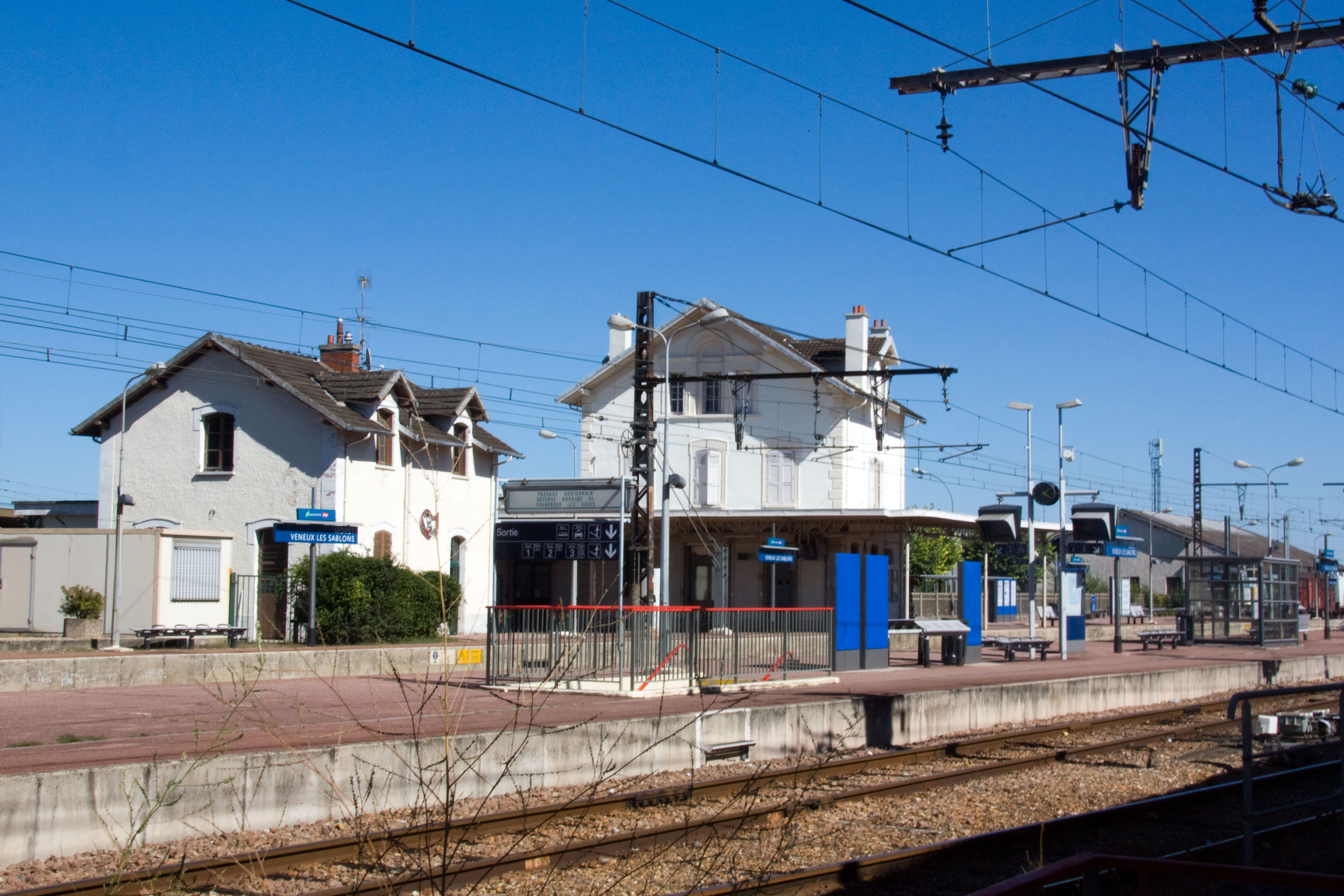
The station

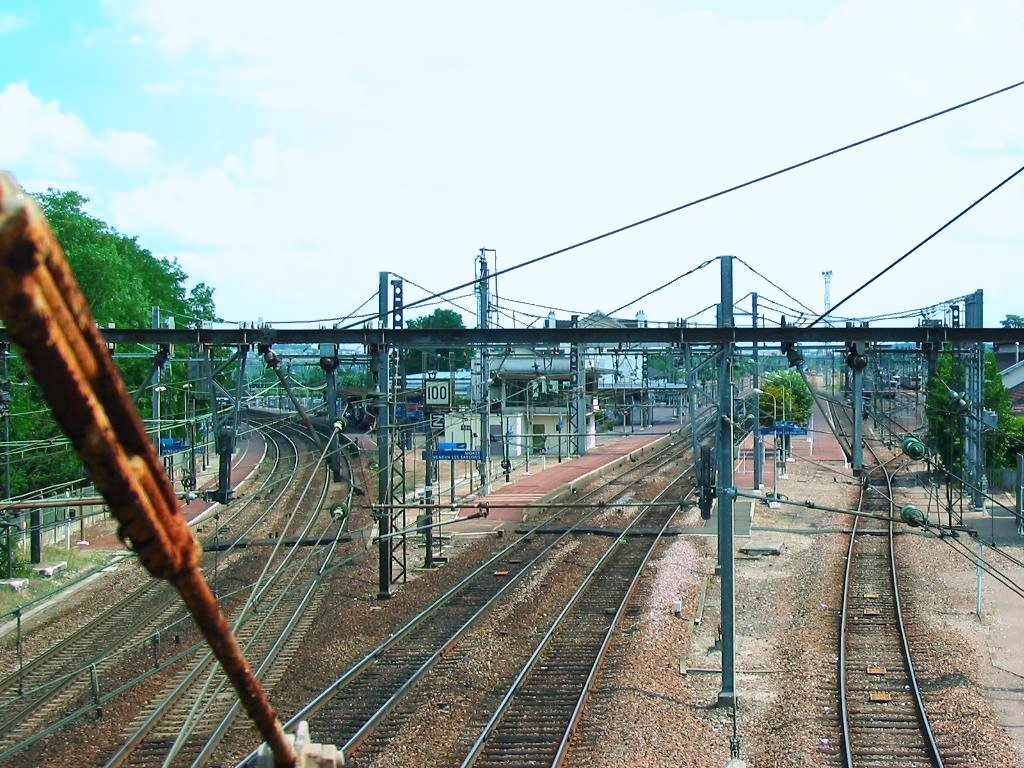
The splitting of the two lines, on the left to Lyon, on the right to Nevers

== See also ==
- Transilien Paris–Lyon
