= Fontainebleau =

- Subprefecture and commune
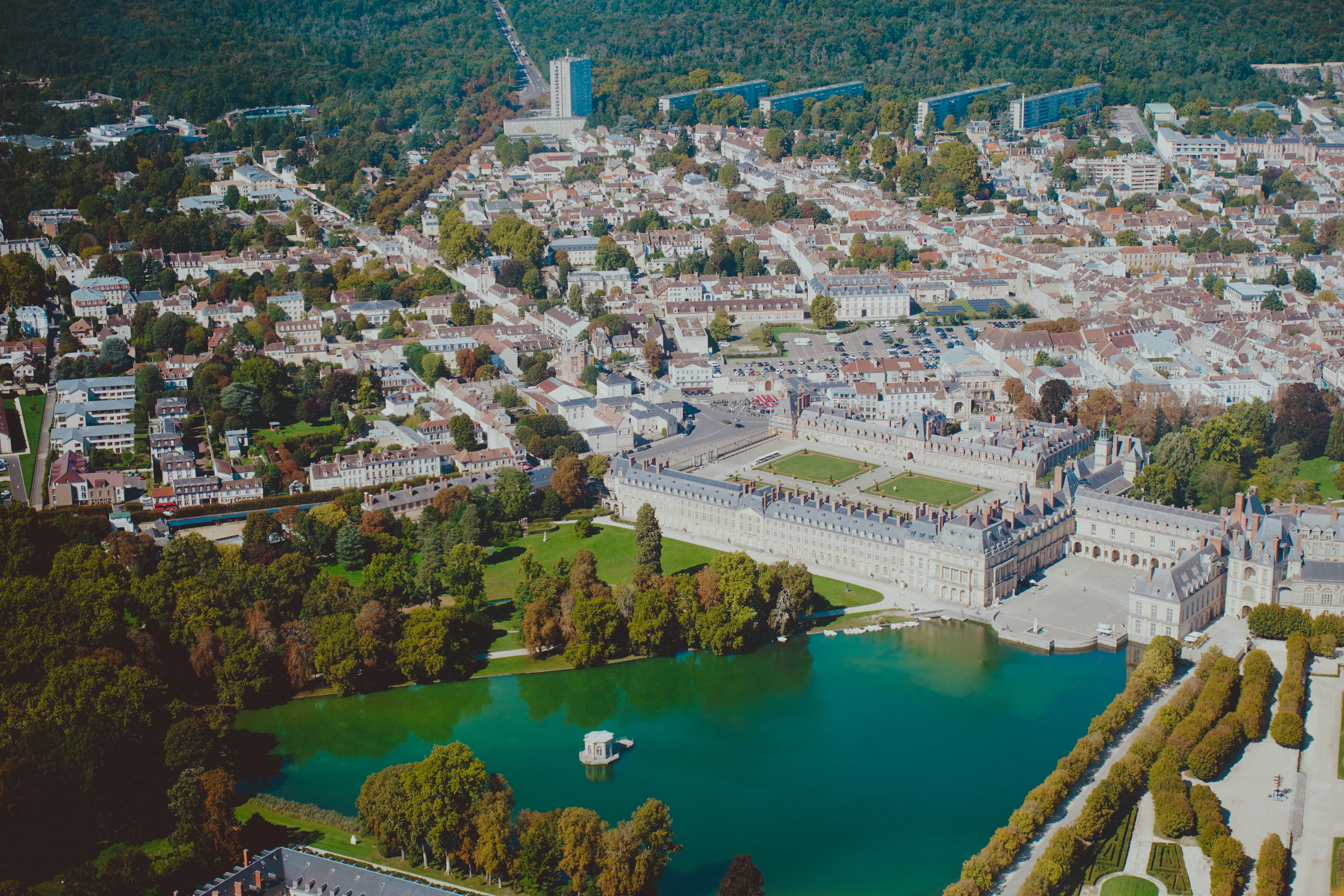
- Aerial view of the palace and the centre of the commune, with a portion of its forest

- Coat of arms
- Location of Fontainebleau
- Location within France Location within Île-de-France (region)
- Coordinates: 48°24′35″N 2°42′09″E
- Country: France
- Region: Île-de-France
- Department: Seine-et-Marne
- Arrondissement: Fontainebleau
- Canton: Fontainebleau
- Intercommunality: CA Pays de Fontainebleau

Government
  - Mayor (2022–2026): Julien Gondard
- Area^{1}: 172.05 km^{2} (66.43 sq mi)
- Elevation: 69 m (226 ft)
- Highest elevation: 150 m (490 ft)
- Lowest elevation: 42 m (138 ft)
- Population (2023): 15,583
  - Density: 90.573/km^{2} (234.58/sq mi)
- Time zone: UTC+01:00 (CET)
  - Summer (DST): UTC+02:00 (CEST)
- INSEE/Postal code: 77186 /77300
- ^{1} French Land Register data, which excludes lakes, ponds, glaciers > 1 km^{2} (0.386 sq mi or 247 acres) and river estuaries.

Fontainebleau (/ˈfɒntɛnbloʊ/ FON-ten-bloh, US also /-bluː/ -bloo, French: [fɔ̃tɛnblo]) is a commune in the metropolitan area of Paris, France. It is located 55.5 kilometres (34.5 mi) south-southeast of the centre of Paris. Fontainebleau is a sub-prefecture of the Seine-et-Marne department, and it is the seat of the arrondissement of Fontainebleau. The commune has the largest land area in the Île-de-France region; it is the only one to cover a larger area than Paris itself. The commune is closest to Seine-et-Marne Prefecture Melun.

Fontainebleau, together with the neighbouring commune of Avon and three other smaller communes, form an urban area of 36,724 inhabitants (2018). This urban area is a satellite of Paris.

Fontainebleau is renowned for the scenic Forest of Fontainebleau, a popular destination for Parisians, as well as for the historic Château de Fontainebleau, which once belonged to the French monarchy. It is also the home of INSEAD, one of the world's leading business schools.

Inhabitants of Fontainebleau are called Bellifontains.

== History ==
=== Name ===
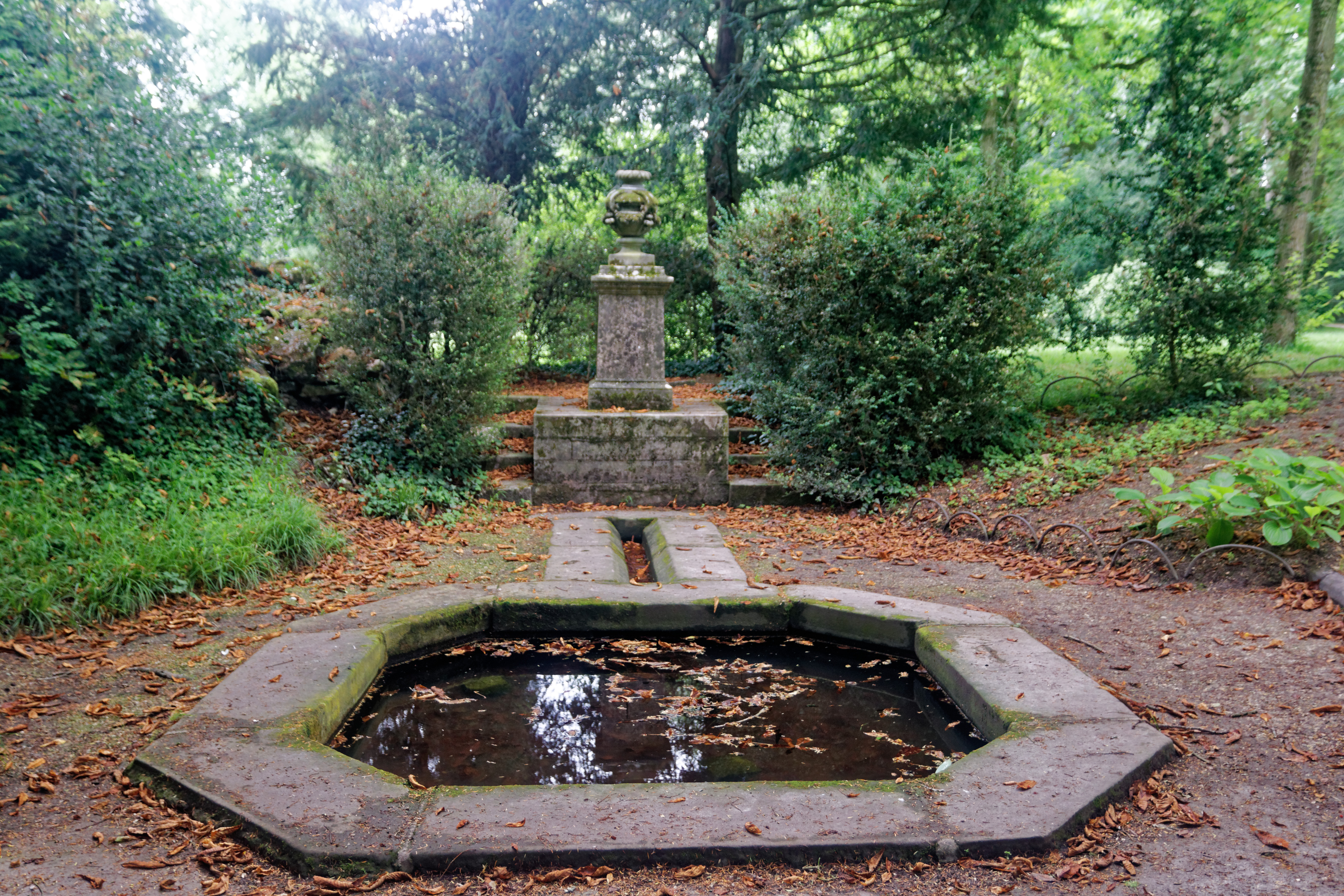
Fontaine Belle-Eau, the spring which gave its name to Fontainebleau

According to the official chateau history, "Fontainebleau" took its name in the 16th century from the "Fontaine Belle-Eau", a natural fresh water spring located in the English garden not far from the chateau. The name means "Spring of beautiful water". In the 19th century the spring was rebuilt to flow into an octagonal stone basin.

Before the 16th century, Fontainebleau was recorded in the Latinised forms Fons Bleaudi, Fons Bliaudi, and Fons Blaadi in the 12th and 13th centuries, and as Fontem blahaud in 1137. In the 17th century it was also sometimes called by the fanciful Latin Fons Bellaqueus. This the origin of the name Bellifontains sometimes used for residents.

A popular legend says that the spring and forest took their names from a favourite hunting dog of King Louis IX named "Blaud" or "Blau". According to the legend, during a hunt the dog became separated from the King, who finally found him by the spring.

According to another source, the name comes from the medieval compound noun of fontaine, meaning spring and fountain, and blitwald, consisting of the Germanic personal name Blit and the Germanic word for forest.

=== Origins ===
This hamlet was endowed with a royal hunting lodge and a chapel by Louis VII in the middle of the twelfth century. A century later, Louis IX, also called Saint Louis, who held Fontainebleau in high esteem and referred to it as "his wilderness", had a country house and a hospital constructed there.

Philip the Fair was born there in 1268 and died there in 1314. In all, thirty-four sovereigns, from Louis VI, the Fat, (1081–1137) to Napoleon III (1808–1873), spent time at Fontainebleau.

The connection between the town of Fontainebleau and the French monarchy was reinforced with the transformation of the royal country house into a true royal palace, the Palace of Fontainebleau. This was accomplished by the great builder-king, Francis I (1494–1547), who, in the largest of his many construction projects, reconstructed, expanded, and transformed the royal château at Fontainebleau into a residence that became his favourite, as well as the residence of his mistress, Anne, duchess of Étampes.

=== Early modern period ===
From the sixteenth to the eighteenth century, every monarch, from Francis I to Louis XV, made important renovations at the Palace of Fontainebleau, including demolitions, reconstructions, additions, and embellishments of various descriptions, all of which endowed it with a character that is a bit heterogeneous, but harmonious nonetheless.

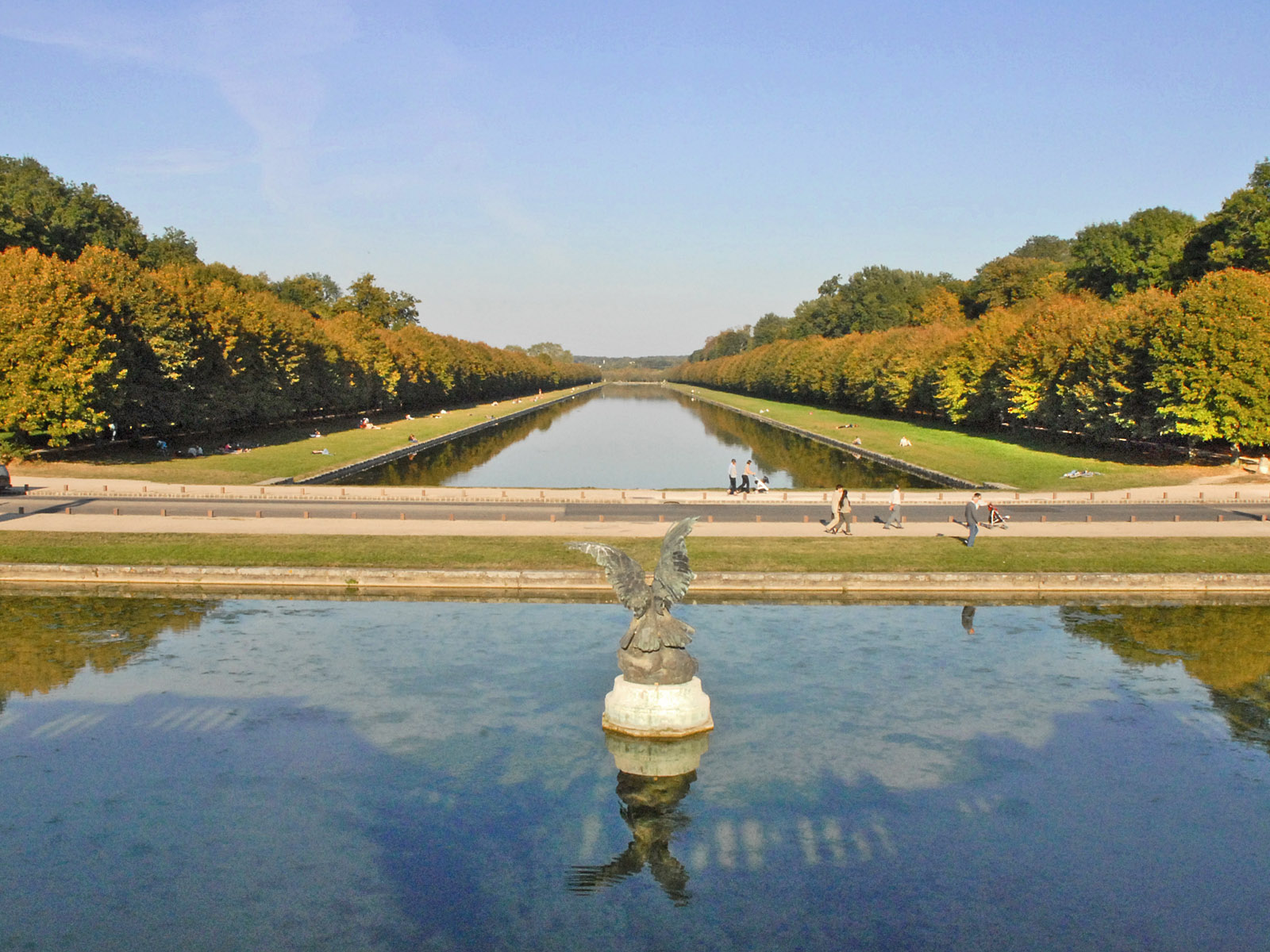
Fontainebleau palace garden fountain and Grand canal

On 18 October 1685, Louis XIV signed the Edict of Fontainebleau there. Also known as the Revocation of the Edict of Nantes, this royal fiat reversed the permission granted to the Huguenots in 1598 to worship publicly in specified locations and hold certain other privileges. The result was that a large number of Protestants were forced to convert to the Catholic faith, killed, or forced into exile, mainly in the Low Countries, Prussia and in England.

The 1762 Treaty of Fontainebleau, a secret agreement between France and Spain concerning the Louisiana territory in North America, was concluded here. Also, preliminary negotiations, held before the 1763 Treaty of Paris was signed, ending the Seven Years' War, were at Fontainebleau.

During the French Revolution, Fontainebleau was temporarily renamed Fontaine-la-Montagne, meaning "Fountain by the Mountain". (The mountain referred to is the series of rocky formations located in the forest of Fontainebleau.)

=== Modern period ===
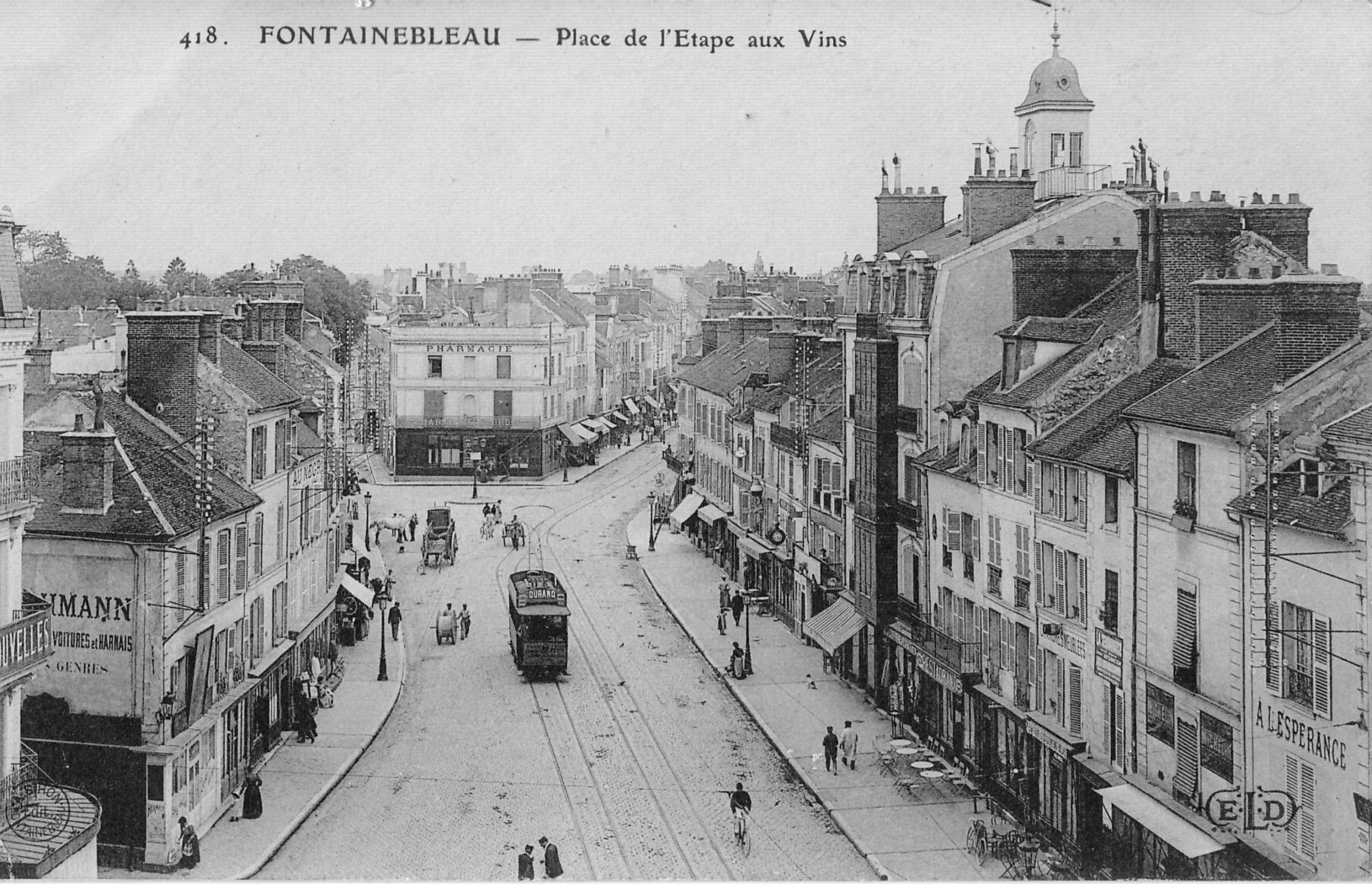
Place de l'Etape aux Vins before 1914, showing the tramway

On 29 October 1807, Manuel Godoy, chancellor to the Spanish king, Charles IV and Napoleon signed the Treaty of Fontainebleau, which authorized the passage of French troops through Spanish territories so that they might invade Portugal.

On 20 June 1812, Pope Pius VII arrived at the château of Fontainebleau, after a secret transfer from Savona, accompanied by his personal physician, Balthazard Claraz. In poor health, the Pope was the prisoner of Napoleon, and he remained in his genteel prison at Fontainebleau for nineteen months. From June 1812 until 23 January 1814, the Pope never left his apartments.

On 20 April 1814, Napoleon Bonaparte, shortly before his first abdication, bid farewell to the Old Guard, the renowned grognards (grumblers) who had served with him since his first campaigns, in the "White Horse Courtyard" (la cour du Cheval Blanc) at the Palace of Fontainebleau. (The courtyard has since been renamed the "Courtyard of Goodbyes".) According to contemporary sources, the occasion was very moving. The 1814 Treaty of Fontainebleau stripped Napoleon of his powers (but not his title as Emperor of the French) and sent him into exile on Elba.

Until the 19th century, Fontainebleau was a village and a suburb of Avon. Later, it developed as an independent residential city.

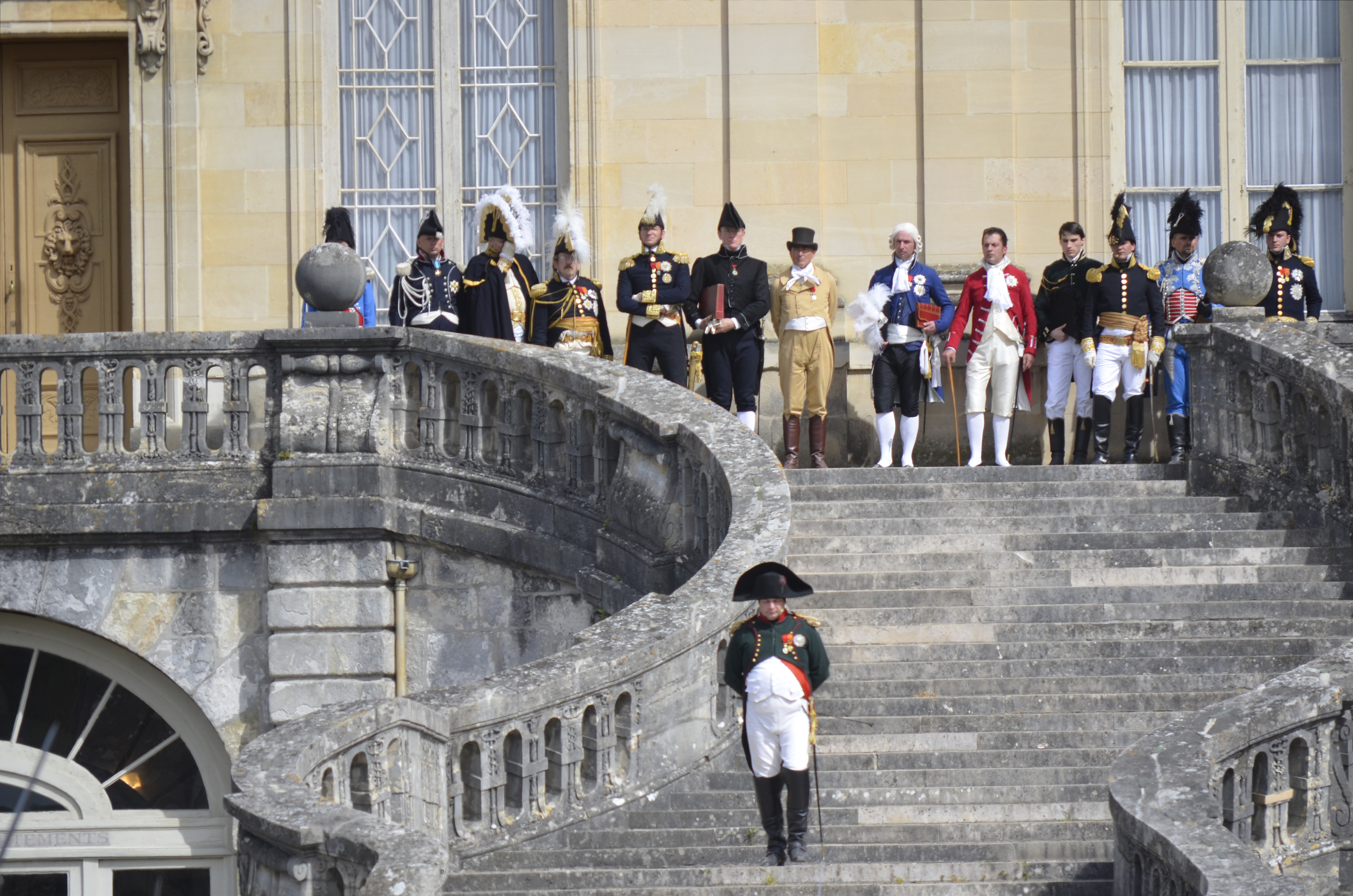
Historical reenactment in Fontainebleau of the bicentenary of Napoleon's Farewell to the Old Guard, 20 April 2014. Napoleon is going down the famous stairs of Fontainebleau castle to meet with the Old Guard.

For the 1924 Summer Olympics, the town played host to the riding portion of the modern pentathlon event. This event took place near a golf course.

In July and August 1946, the town hosted the Franco-Vietnamese Conference, intended to find a solution to the long-contested struggle for Vietnam's independence from France, but the conference ended in failure.

Fontainebleau also hosted the general staff of the Allied Forces in Central Europe (Allied Forces Center or AFCENT) and the land forces command (LANDCENT); the air forces command (AIRCENT) was located nearby at Camp Guynemer. These facilities were in place from the inception of NATO until France's partial withdrawal from NATO in 1967 when the United States returned those bases to French control. NATO moved AFCENT to Brunssum in the Netherlands and AIRCENT to Ramstein in West Germany. (The Supreme Headquarters Allied Powers Europe, also known as SHAPE, was located at Rocquencourt, west of Paris, quite a distance from Fontainebleau).

In 2008, the men's World Championship of Real Tennis (Jeu de Paume) was held in the tennis court of the Chateau. The real tennis World Championship is the oldest in sport and Fontainebleau has one of only two active courts in France.

== Population ==
Historical population
Year	Pop.	±% p.a.
1968	18,094	—
1975	16,778	−1.07%
1982	15,679	−0.96%
1990	15,714	+0.03%
1999	15,942	+0.16%
2007	15,740	−0.16%
2012	14,908	−1.08%
2017	14,886	−0.03%
2023	15,583	+0.77%
Source: INSEE

== Tourism ==
Fontainebleau is a popular tourist destination; each year, 300,000 people visit the palace and more than 13 million people visit the forest.

=== Forest of Fontainebleau ===
The forest of Fontainebleau surrounds the town and dozens of nearby villages. It is protected by France's Office National des Forêts, and it is recognised as a French national park. It is managed in order that its wild plants and trees, such as the rare service tree of Fontainebleau, and its populations of birds, mammals, and butterflies, can be conserved. It is a former royal hunting park often visited by hikers and horse riders. The forest is also well regarded for bouldering and is particularly popular among climbers, as it is the biggest developed area of that kind in the world.

=== Royal Château de Fontainebleau ===
The Royal Château de Fontainebleau is a large palace where the kings of France took their ease. It is also the site where the French royal court, from 1528 onwards, entertained the body of new ideas that became known as the Renaissance.

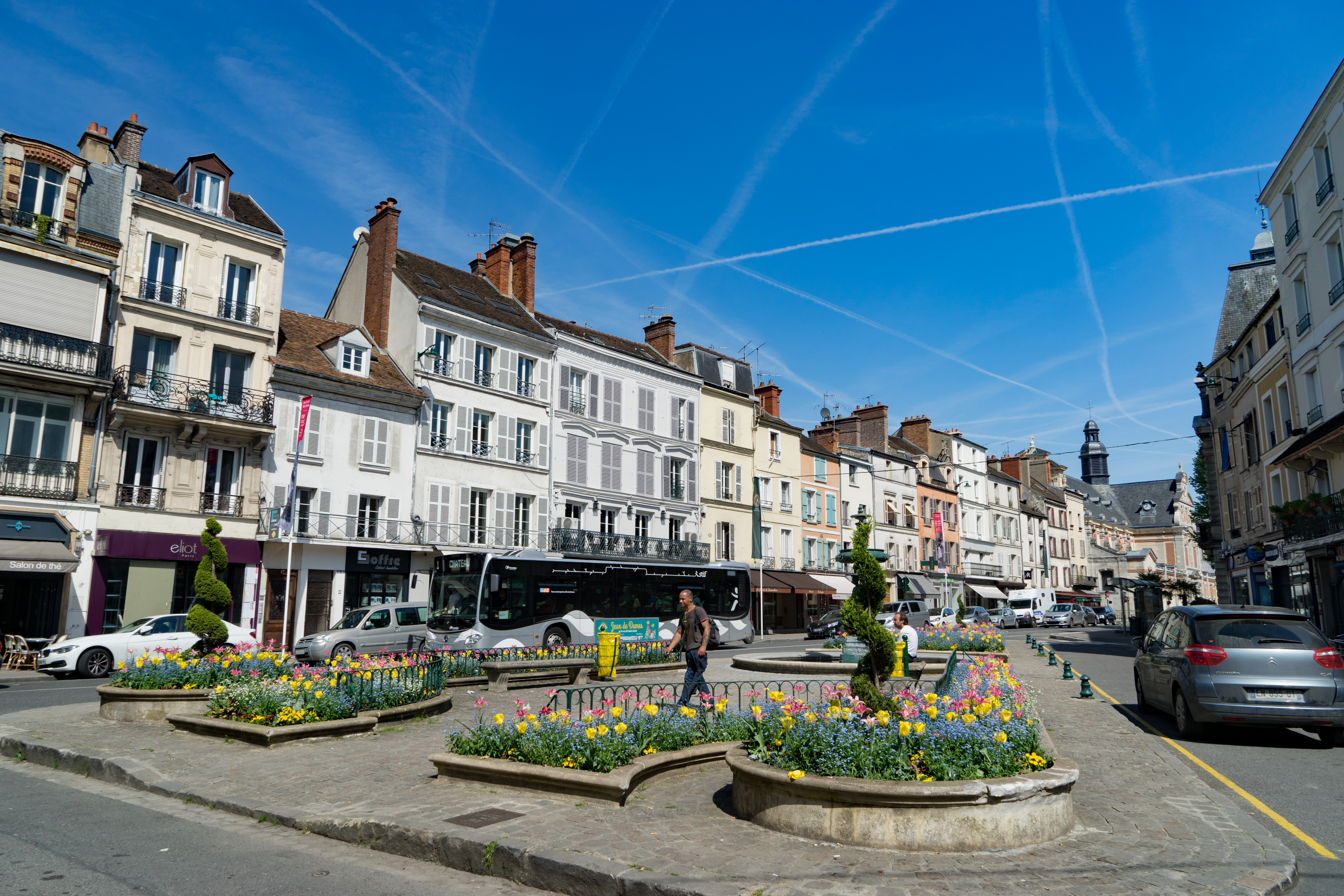
Place Franklin-Roosevelt, in the town centre

=== INSEAD ===
The European (and historic) campus of the INSEAD business school is located at the edge of Fontainebleau, by the Lycee Francois Couperin. INSEAD students live in local accommodations around the Fontainebleau area, and especially in the surrounding towns.

=== Other notables ===
- The graves of the philosopher and mystic George Gurdjieff and the New Zealand-born writer Katherine Mansfield can be found in the cemetery at Avon.
- Synagogue of Fontainebleau

== Transport ==
Fontainebleau is served by stations on the Transilien Line R: Fontainebleau–Avon, Fontainebleau-Forêt and Thomery. Trains run from Paris to Montereau and Montargis. Fontainebleau–Avon station, the closest to the centre of Fontainebleau, is located in Avon near its boundary with the commune of Fontainebleau.

From 1896 to 1953, Fontainebleau and its surrounding area were served by the Fontainebleau tramway.

Fontainebleau is served by several bus lines of the Île-de-France bus network: lines 1, 3, 4, 8, 20, 21, 23, 43, 45, 112, 202, 208, 210 of the Fontainebleau – Avon bus network and lines 7A, 7B, 34 of the Loing Valley – Nemours bus network.

== Climate ==
Climate data for Fontainebleau (1991–2020 normals, extremes 1989–present)
Month	Jan	Feb	Mar	Apr	May	Jun	Jul	Aug	Sep	Oct	Nov	Dec	Year
Record high °C (°F)	17.0 (62.6)	22.5 (72.5)	26.8 (80.2)	29.1 (84.4)	33.6 (92.5)	38.5 (101.3)	42.7 (108.9)	40.9 (105.6)	35.3 (95.5)	29.3 (84.7)	22.6 (72.7)	17.7 (63.9)	42.7 (108.9)
Mean daily maximum °C (°F)	7.2 (45.0)	8.7 (47.7)	12.9 (55.2)	16.6 (61.9)	20.1 (68.2)	23.6 (74.5)	26.3 (79.3)	26.2 (79.2)	21.9 (71.4)	16.6 (61.9)	10.9 (51.6)	7.6 (45.7)	16.5 (61.7)
Daily mean °C (°F)	3.8 (38.8)	4.3 (39.7)	7.4 (45.3)	10.2 (50.4)	13.8 (56.8)	17.2 (63.0)	19.5 (67.1)	19.1 (66.4)	15.4 (59.7)	11.5 (52.7)	7.0 (44.6)	4.3 (39.7)	11.1 (52.0)
Mean daily minimum °C (°F)	0.5 (32.9)	0.0 (32.0)	1.8 (35.2)	3.7 (38.7)	7.5 (45.5)	10.8 (51.4)	12.6 (54.7)	12.1 (53.8)	8.8 (47.8)	6.4 (43.5)	3.0 (37.4)	1.1 (34.0)	5.7 (42.3)
Record low °C (°F)	−16.1 (3.0)	−15.9 (3.4)	−14.6 (5.7)	−8.5 (16.7)	−3.9 (25.0)	−1.0 (30.2)	3.0 (37.4)	1.8 (35.2)	−1.5 (29.3)	−5.5 (22.1)	−14.3 (6.3)	−12.6 (9.3)	−16.1 (3.0)
Average precipitation mm (inches)	57.6 (2.27)	54.1 (2.13)	52.9 (2.08)	59.4 (2.34)	67.0 (2.64)	59.8 (2.35)	62.2 (2.45)	59.3 (2.33)	60.7 (2.39)	68.4 (2.69)	66.8 (2.63)	71.9 (2.83)	740.1 (29.14)
Average precipitation days (≥ 1.0 mm)	12.0	10.8	9.3	10.0	9.9	8.7	7.8	8.0	8.4	10.1	11.5	12.7	119.1
Source: Meteociel

== Hospital ==
Fontainebleau has a campus of the Centre hospitalier Sud Seine et Marne.

== In popular culture ==
Fontainebleau and its surrounding forest appear in a number of literary works. In Honoré de Balzac's La Femme de trente ans, the landscape between the Loing and the Seine is described as bordered by the Forest of Fontainebleau.

In Gustave Flaubert's 1869 novel Sentimental Education, Frédéric Moreau and Rosanette spend several days at Fontainebleau while seeking refuge from the turmoil of revolutionary Paris. They visit the Palace of Fontainebleau and explore the surrounding Forest of Fontainebleau. Literary critic F. W. Dupee described the Fontainebleau sequence as one of the novel's two principal country episodes.

Fontainebleau is also used in Patricia Highsmith's Tom Ripley novels. Beginning with Ripley Under Ground (1970), Ripley lives with his wife Héloïse at Belle Ombre, a country house near the fictional village of Villeperce. The setting recurs throughout the later Ripley novels; a 1992 review of Ripley Under Water in The Washington Post describes Belle Ombre as being near Fontainebleau and Ripley is often described by Highsmith as moving in the streets of Fontainebleau and surrounding places.

== Notable people ==
- Philip VI of France, (1293–1350) First Valois King of France. Born in Fontainebleau.
- Aga Khan IV, international business magnate
- Alfonso XIII, king of Spain, after his abdication
- Raoul Anglès (1887–1967), politician
- Arnold Bennett (1867–1931), writer, lived in Fontainebleau from 1908 to 1912
- Rosa Bonheur, a 19th-century artist
- Gabrièle Buffet-Picabia (1881–1985), art critic, first wife of painter Francis Picabia was born in Fontainebleau
- Christina, Queen of Sweden; her lover, Gian Rinaldo Monaldeschi, was murdered in Fontainebleau
- Claude-François Denencourt, inventor of modern hiking and nature tourism
- Jean-Claude Gorgy, French playwright born in Fontainebleu
- Joseph Charles Hippolyte Crosse (1826–1898), conchologist, lived and died at Château d'Argeville, near Fontainebleau
- Ernst August, Prince of Hanover and Caroline, Princess of Hanover
- Lin Fengmian, Chinese painter who advocated the synthesis of Western techniques and Eastern traditions and later became known as the father of modern Chinese painting, brushed up on his French in Fontainebleau before moving on to study art at the Ecole Nationale Superieure des Beaux-Arts of Paris
- Francis I of France, built a large part of the palace
- Francis II of France, born in Fontainebleau
- Henry III of France, born in Fontainebleau
- Henry IV of France, built a part of the palace
- Anna Elizabeth Klumpke, an early twentieth-century artist
- Pierre Levassor (1808–1870), actor
- Pascal Lecocq, born in 1958, fine art painter, study at École Comairas (1973–1977) and exhibit for the 1st time in 1977;
- Louis XIII, king of France, born in Fontainebleau
- Louis XIV of France, built a part of the palace
- Louis XV, king of France, built a part of the palace
- Louis XVI and Marie Antoinette, king and queen of France, built a part of the palace
- Mark Maggiori, lead vocalist of Pleymo
- Katherine Mansfield (1888–1923), New Zealander short story writer, died in Fontainebleau
- Oscar Milosz, poet, novelist, dramatist and Lithuanian diplomat died in Fontainebleau in 1939.
- Louis Victoire Lux de Montmorin-Saint-Hérem (1762–1792), French military man
- Napoleon
- Napoleon III
- Olivia Onesti, cyclist, born in Fontainebleau
- Pope Pius VII, lived (as a prisoner of Napoleon) in the palace
- Philip IV of France, born and died in Fontainebleau
- Django Reinhardt, died near Fontainebleau, in Samois-sur-Seine
- Robert Louis Stevenson, a Scottish novelist, poet, essayist, and travel writer
- Romain Thievin, racing driver, born in Fontainebleau
- Lilian Thuram, football player, World Cup and European Championship winner
- Luke Thompson, actor, grew up in Fontainebleau
- Paul Ji, pianist, grew up in Fontainebleau

== Twinning ==
Fontainebleau is twinned with the following cities:

- Konstanz, Germany, since 28 May 1960
- Richmond-upon-Thames, England, United Kingdom, since 1977
- Siem Reap, Cambodia, since 11 June 2000
- Nanjing, China
- Lodi, Italy since 2011
- Sintra, Portugal since 2016
- Alba Iulia, Romania since 2023

== Image gallery ==
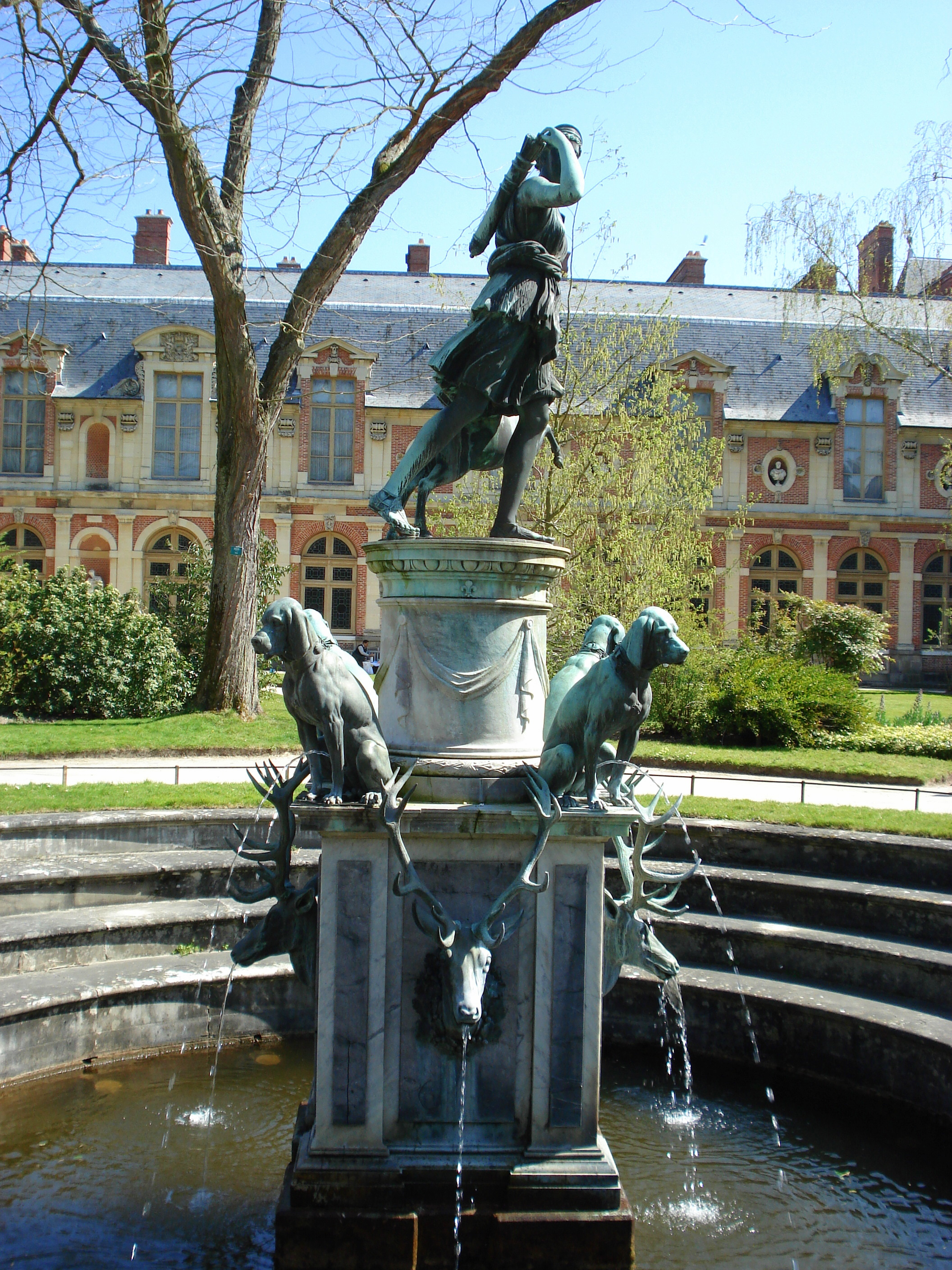
The fountain of Diana

Bell Tower

The Trinity Chapel at the Palace of Fontainebleau

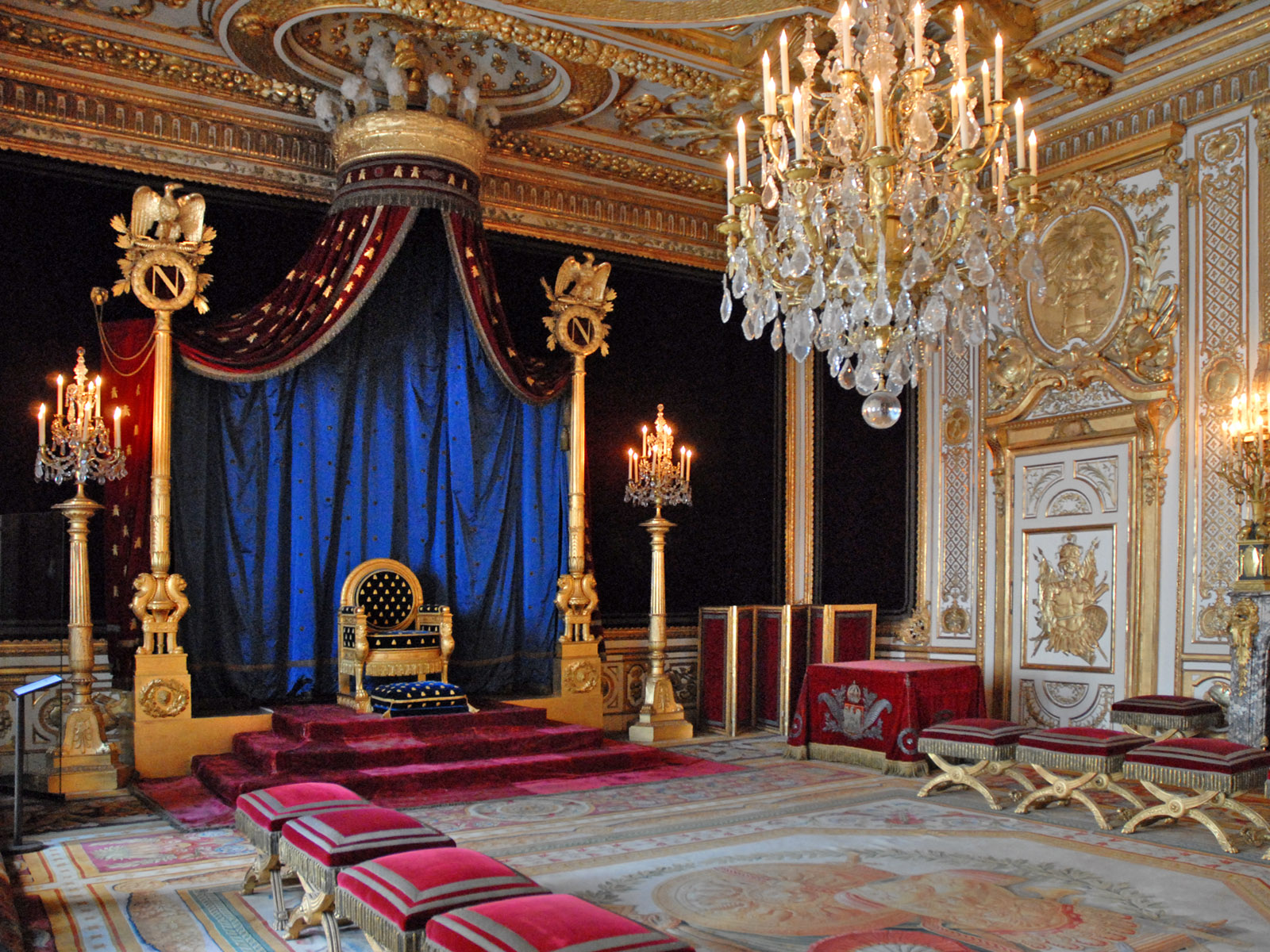
The throne room at the Palace of Fontainebleau

== See also ==
- Communauté d'agglomération du Pays de Fontainebleau
- Fontainebleau rock climbing
- Fontainebleau University Technical Institute
- Milly-la-Forêt
- Treaty of Fontainebleau (1762)
- Prehistoric rock engravings of the Fontainebleau forest

=== Bibliography ===
- Jean-Francois Hebert and Thierry Sarmant, "Fontainebleau- Milles anes d'histoire de France", Texto, (2020)

The Works of Robert Louis Stevenson, Miscellanies, Volume III, Edinburgh, Longmans Green and Co, 1895 "Fontainebleau : Village Communities of Painters" pp. 201–226
