= Fontainebleau–Avon station =

Railway station in Avon, Seine-et-Marne, France

Fontainebleau Avon
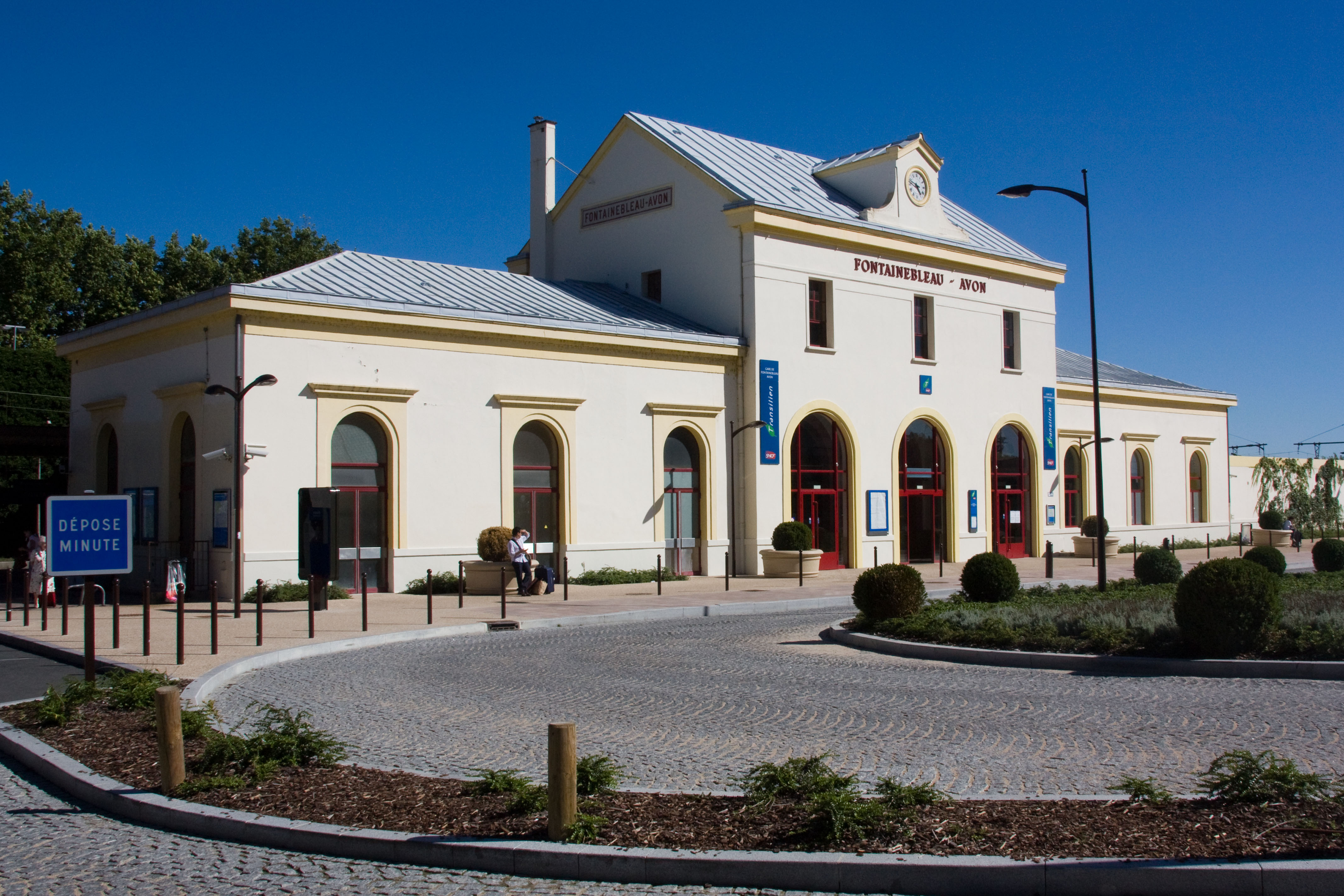
- Fontainebleau–Avon station building

General information
- Location: Avon, Seine-et-Marne, Île-de-France; France
- Coordinates: 48°24′58″N 2°43′37″E
- Owner: SNCF
- Operator: SNCF
- Line: Paris–Marseille railway
- Platforms: 2
- Tracks: 2

Other information
- Station code: 87682211
- Fare zone: 5

Passengers
- 2024: 4,848,120

Services
Preceding station	Transilien	Following station
Bois-le-Roi towards Paris-Lyon	Line R	Thomery towards Montargis or Montereau
Fontainebleau-Forêt no service towards Paris-Lyon	Line R	Thomery towards Montargis

Other services
Preceding station	TER Bourgogne-Franche-Comté	Following station
Bois-le-Roi towards Paris-Lyon	TER	Moret-Veneux-les-Sablons towards Laroche-Migennes
Location

Fontainebleau–Avon (French pronunciation: [fɔ̃tɛnblo avɔ̃]; French: Gare de Fontainebleau - Avon) is a railway station in Avon and Fontainebleau, Île-de-France, France. The station is at kilometric point (KP) 58.941 on the Paris–Marseille railway line.

The station is served by Transilien (commuter) and TER (regional) services operated by SNCF. The station was once served by the TGV a few years ago. The station is served by Transilien line R (Paris-Gare de Lyon). The station was designed by the architect François-Alexis Cendrier, one of many he worked on for the railroad company Chemins de fer de Paris à Lyon et à la Méditerranée (PLM).

The station once benefited from a TGV journey to the Mediterranean Sea, with a train leaving for Marseille at 7:30 am on a Saturday and returning on the Sunday evening, with a journey time is 4:30 hours. However, this is no longer the case.

== Train services ==
The following services call at Fontainebleau–Avon as of 2022:

- local service (TER Bourgogne-Franche-Comté) Paris–Montereau–Sens–Laroche-Migennes
- local service (Transilien R) Paris–Melun–Montereau
- local service (Transilien R) Paris–Melun–Nemours–Montargis

== Connections ==
- Fontainebleau – Moret: 3401 3403 3404 3405 3406 3407 3408 3418 3421 3423 3439 3451 3454
- Essonne Sud Est: 4341
- Noctilien: N137

== Gallery ==
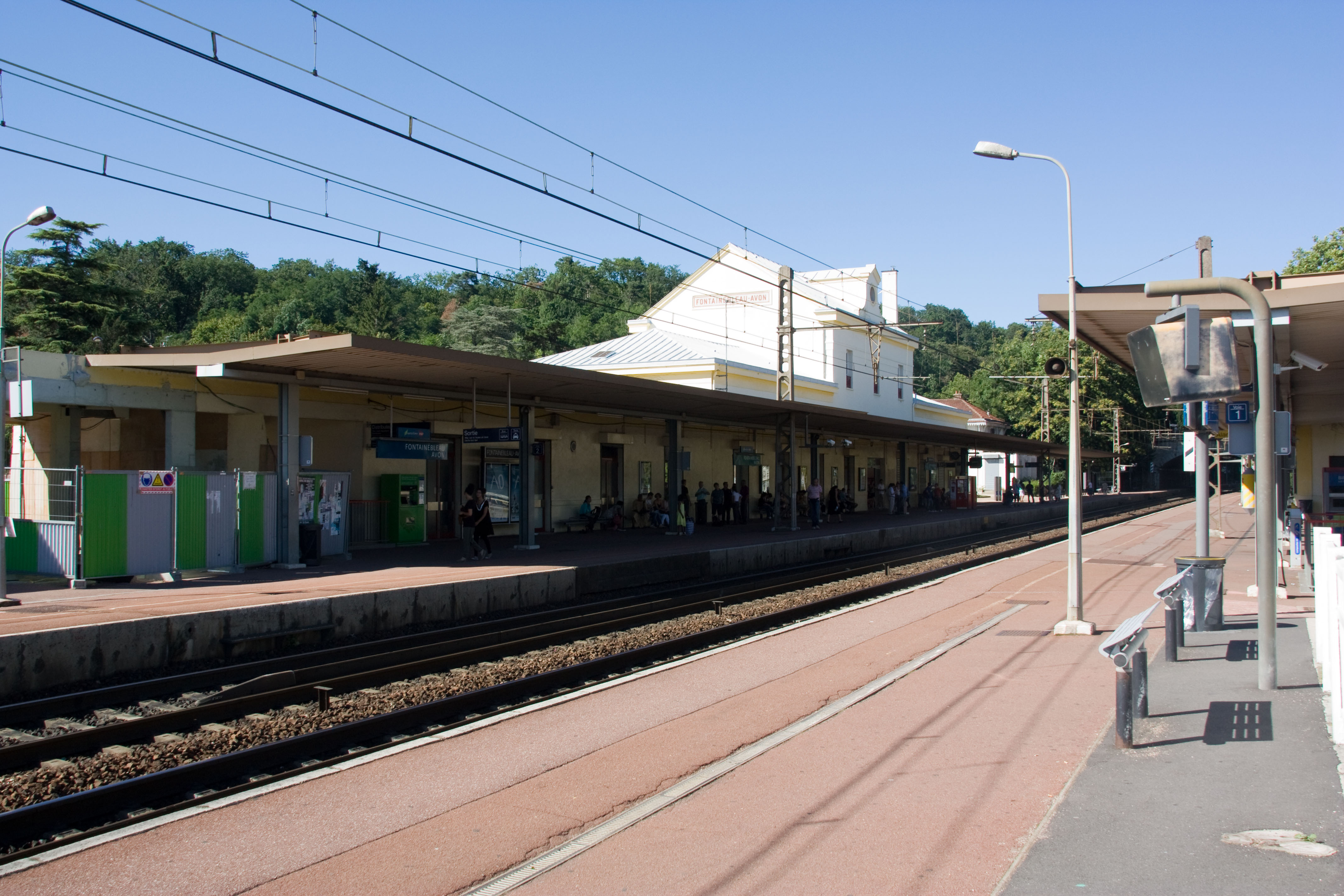
The station

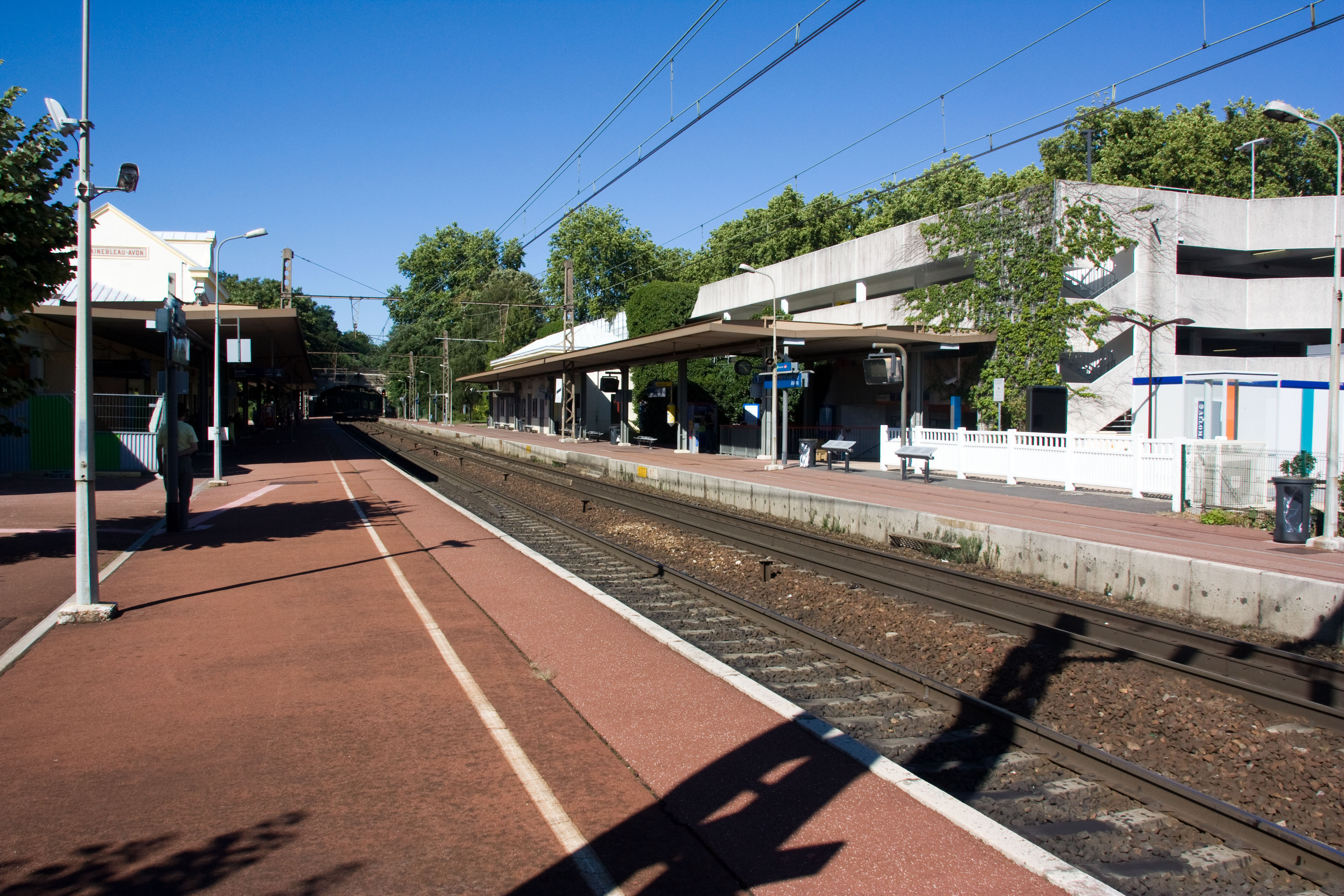
The station

== See also ==
- Transilien Paris–Lyon
