= Auxerre-Saint-Gervais station =

Railway station in Auxerre, France

Coordinates: 47°47′53″N 3°35′6″E

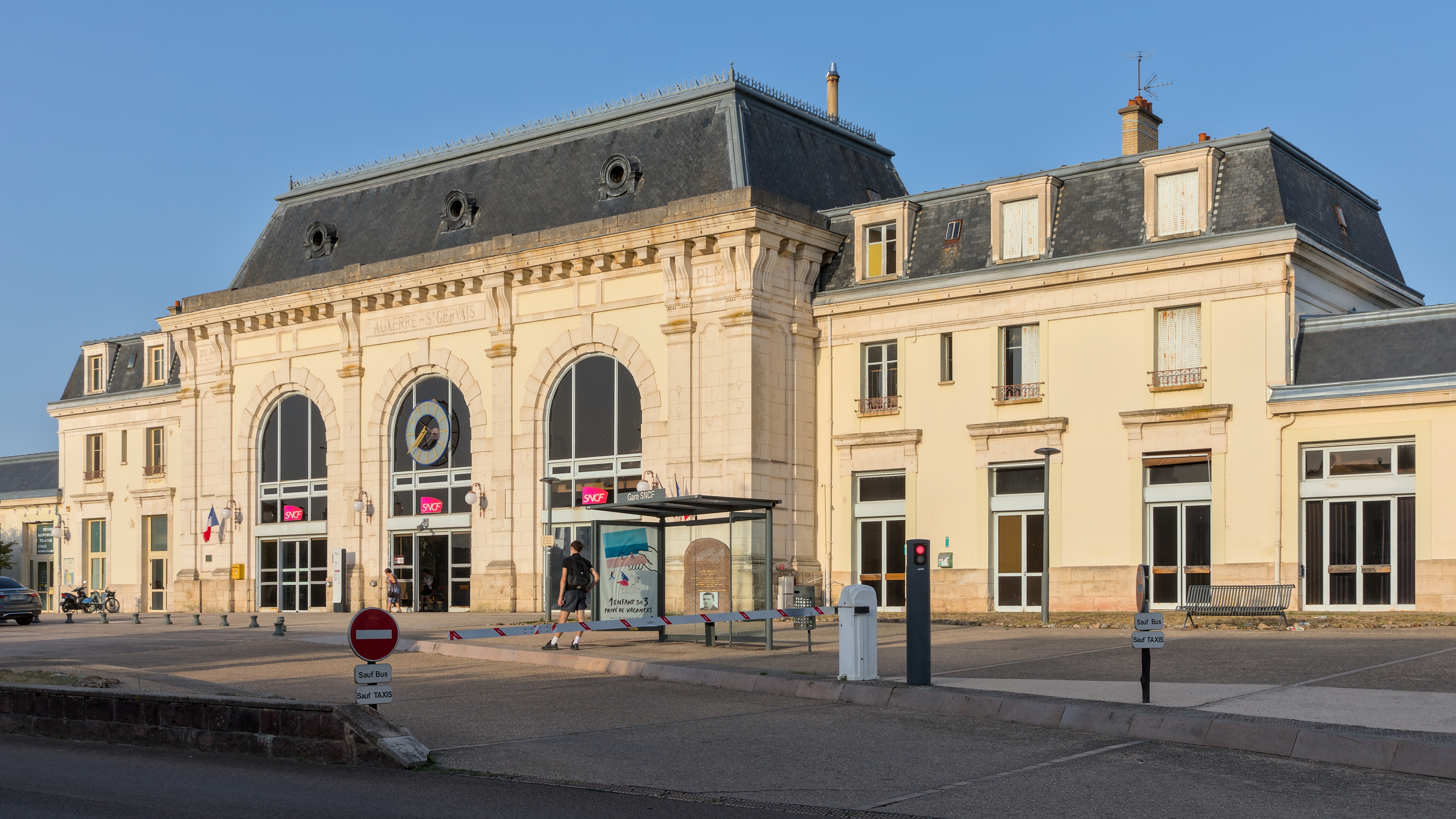
The station building

Auxerre-Saint-Gervais station (French: Gare de Auxerre-Saint-Gervais) is a railway station serving the town Auxerre, Yonne department, central France. The station is served by regional trains towards Dijon, Paris, Corbigny and Avallon.

Preceding station	TER Bourgogne-Franche-Comté	Following station
Terminus	TER	Monéteau-Gurgy towards Dijon
Laroche-Migennes Terminus	TER	Champs-Saint-Bris towards Corbigny
Laroche-Migennes towards Paris-Bercy	TER	Vincelles towards Avallon
