= Avon, Seine-et-Marne =

Avon
- Commune
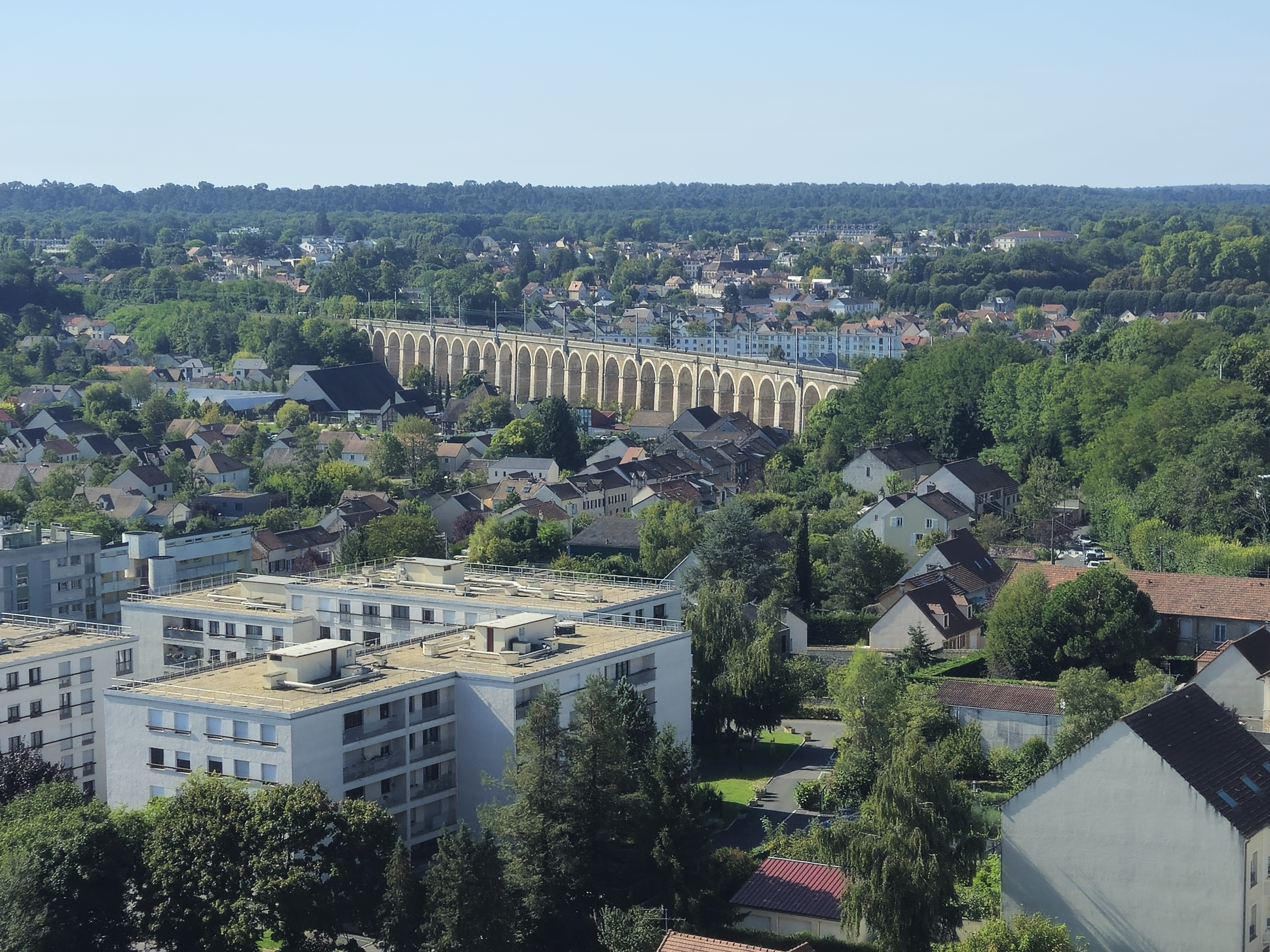
- General view of the city centered on the Changis Viaduct, photographed in September 2025.

- Coat of arms
- Location of Avon
- Location within France Location within Île-de-France (region)
- Coordinates: 48°24′35″N 2°42′58″E
- Country: France
- Region: Île-de-France
- Department: Seine-et-Marne
- Arrondissement: Fontainebleau
- Canton: Fontainebleau
- Intercommunality: CA Pays Fontainebleau

Government
  - Mayor (2020–2026): Marie-Charlotte Nouhaud
- Area^{1}: 3.83 km^{2} (1.48 sq mi)
- Highest elevation: 100 m (330 ft)
- Lowest elevation: 42 m (138 ft)
- Population (2023): 13,651
  - Density: 3,560/km^{2} (9,230/sq mi)
- Time zone: UTC+01:00 (CET)
  - Summer (DST): UTC+02:00 (CEST)
- INSEE/Postal code: 77014 /77210
- ^{1} French Land Register data, which excludes lakes, ponds, glaciers > 1 km^{2} (0.386 sq mi or 247 acres) and river estuaries.

Avon (French: [avɔ̃]) is a commune in the Seine-et-Marne department in the Île-de-France region in north-central France.

== Geography ==
Avon and Fontainebleau, together with three other smaller communes, form an urban area of 36,713 inhabitants. The two towns share a common boundary, whereas other miscellaneous smaller villages are scattered around in the forest that surrounds them (one of the largest in France). Avon is built between two hills; one of them, known as the Butte Montceau, supports the homonymous neighbourhood, made of small blocks and houses; on the opposite one is built the Fougères neighbourhood, consisting of larger buildings. The rest of the town consists mainly of small houses, in the neighbourhoods of La Vallée and Vieil Avon. As previously said, the town is nested in the Fontainebleau forest; it is bordered on one side by the Seine river, crossed over by the Pont de Valvins.

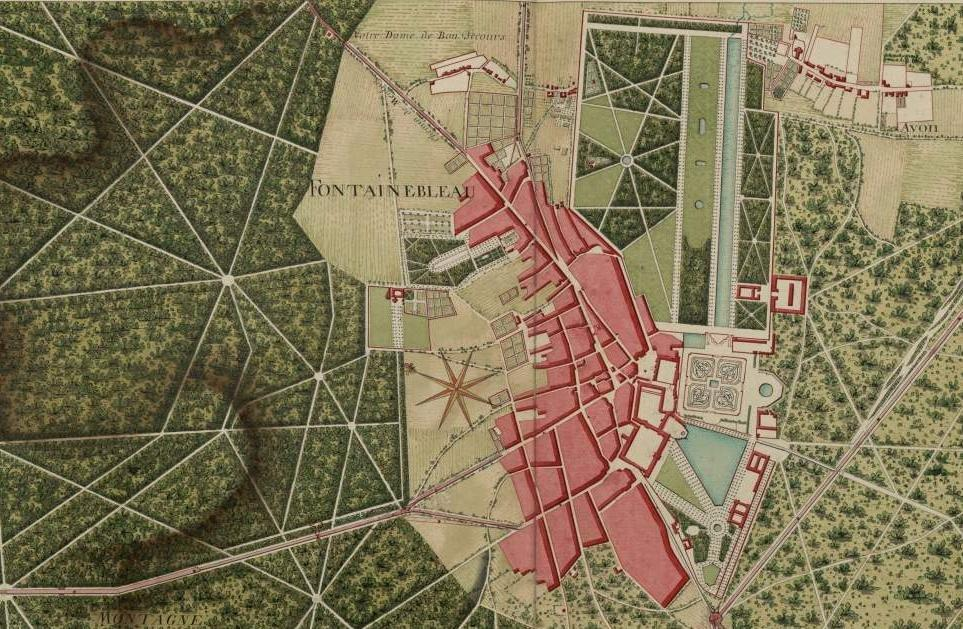
Map of Fontainebleau and Avon from Atlas de Trudaine, 18th century (French National Archives)

== Demographics ==
The inhabitants are called Avonnais in French.

Historical population
Year	Pop.	±% p.a.
1968	13,552	—
1975	15,377	+1.82%
1982	14,778	−0.57%
1990	13,873	−0.79%
1999	14,030	+0.13%
2007	13,970	−0.05%
2012	14,151	+0.26%
2017	13,886	−0.38%
2023	13,651	−0.28%
Source: INSEE

== Places of interest ==
The main attraction in the town is the old, Romanesque church of St. Pierre, where the 18th-century French mathematician Étienne Bézout was buried. Another historically relevant place is the Prieuré des Basses Loges, where Georges Gurdjieff lived and taught in the early twenties; he is buried in the town cemetery, along with writer Katherine Mansfield who died of tuberculosis while attending his teachings.

== Transportation ==
Avon is served by the Fontainebleau-Avon station on the Transilien Paris – Lyon.

== See also ==
- Communes of the Seine-et-Marne department
