= Pierre Levassor =

French Stage Actor

Pierre-Thomas Levassor, simply called Levassor, (25 January 1808, in Fontainebleau – 1 January 1870) was a French stage actor

== Career ==
- 1842 : La Nuit aux soufflets, two-act comédie en vaudevilles by Dumanoir and Adolphe d'Ennery, Théâtre des Variétés : Duke Hercule III
- 1843 : Brelan de troupiers, one-act comédie en vaudevilles by Dumanoir an Étienne Arago, Théâtre du Palais-Royal : Father Gargousse, Valentin Gargousse and Éléonore Gargousse
- 1845 : Les Pommes de terre malades, by Clairville and Dumanoir, Théâtre du Palais-Royal : Titi
- 1853 : Les Folies dramatiques, by Clairville and Dumanoir, Théâtre des Variétés : Griolet
- 1854 : Ôtez votre fille, s'il vous plaît, two-act comedy mingled with singing by Eugène Labiche and Marc-Michel, Théâtre du Palais-Royal : Gusman de Follebraise
