= Synagogue of Fontainebleau =

Orthodox synagogue in Fontainebleau, France

Synagogue of Fontainbleau
- Synagogue de Fontainbleau
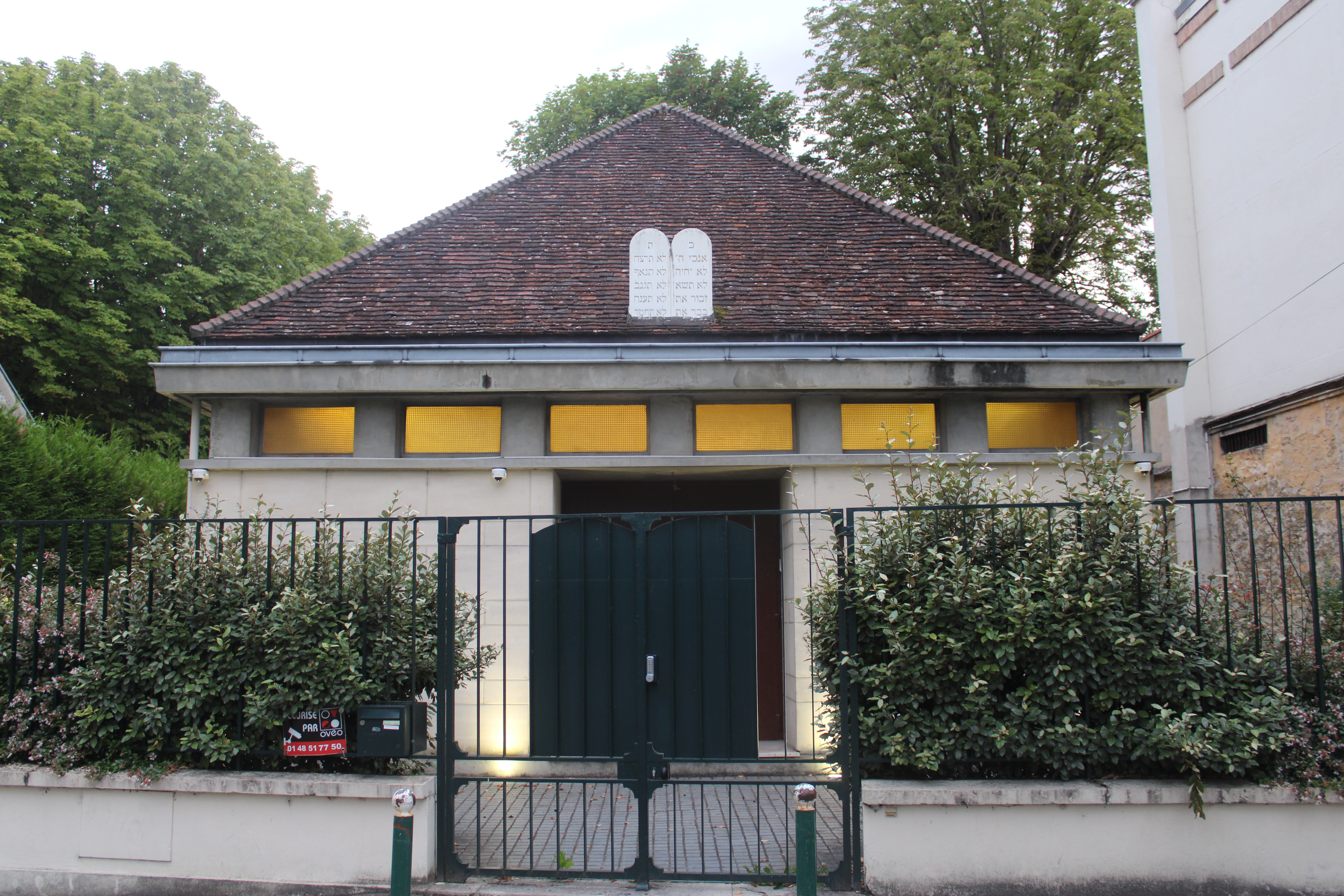
- The synagogue in 2021

- Location of the synagogue in France

Religion
- Affiliation: Orthodox Judaism
- Ecclesiastical or organizational status: Synagogue
- Year consecrated: April 4, 1965
- Status: Active

Location
- Location: 38 Rue Paul-Séramy, Fontainebleau, Seine-et-Marne
- Country: France
- Interactive map of Synagogue of Fontainbleau
- Coordinates: 48°24′12″N 2°42′15″E

Architecture
- Established: c. 1840s (as a congregation)
- Completed: 1861 (first synagogue); 1965 (current synagogue)

The Synagogue of Fontainebleau is an Orthodox Jewish congregation and synagogue, located in the southeast end of Rue Paul-Séramy, before Place du Bois-d'Hyver and not far from downtown Fontainebleau, in the southwest of Département of Seine-et-Marne, France. The building and its land are adjacent to the gardens of the Palace of Fontainebleau.

The modern-day synagogue was completed in 1965, to replace an earlier synagogue, completed in 1857, which was burned down during the Nazi occupation of France in 1941.

== History ==
The first religious site for Jews in the city was created by the Wahl brothers in a Hôtel particulier on Rue des Trois-Maillets and then later in a house close to Rue des Maudinés (today Rue des Pins) behind Hôtel des Menus-Plaisirs. In 1845, the Jews of Fontainebleau requested money from Queen Amélie to repair their house of prayer.

=== First synagogue ===
Groundbreaking on the synagogue began on May 21, 1856. The synagogue was financed through a raffled organized by Baroness Rothschild. The synagogue was consecrated occurred on August 23, 1857. On this occasion the torah scrolls were transferred to the Rue des Pins location.

Following the invasion of Nazi forces in 1940, the synagogue was vandalized with antisemitic graffiti. The synagogue was burned April 10–12, 1941, not by the Nazis, but by French collaborators, who were not identified.

A memorial plaque to the first synagogue was placed on the wall a building at 36 Rue Paul-Séramy.

=== Modern synagogue ===
A new synagogue was rebuilt following the war. The synagogue was consecrated on April 4, 1965, with Chief Rabbi of France Jacob Kaplan, Chief Rabbi of Pairs Meyer Jaïs and Alain de Rothschild, President of the Israelite Central Consistory of Paris.

The building adopted a rectangular design. The Ten Commandments are mounted above the entrance.

== Gallery ==
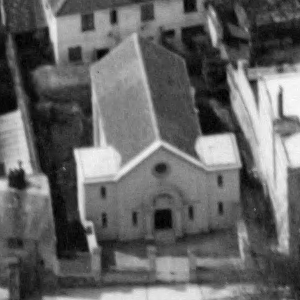
Aerial view of the first synagogue, April 1935

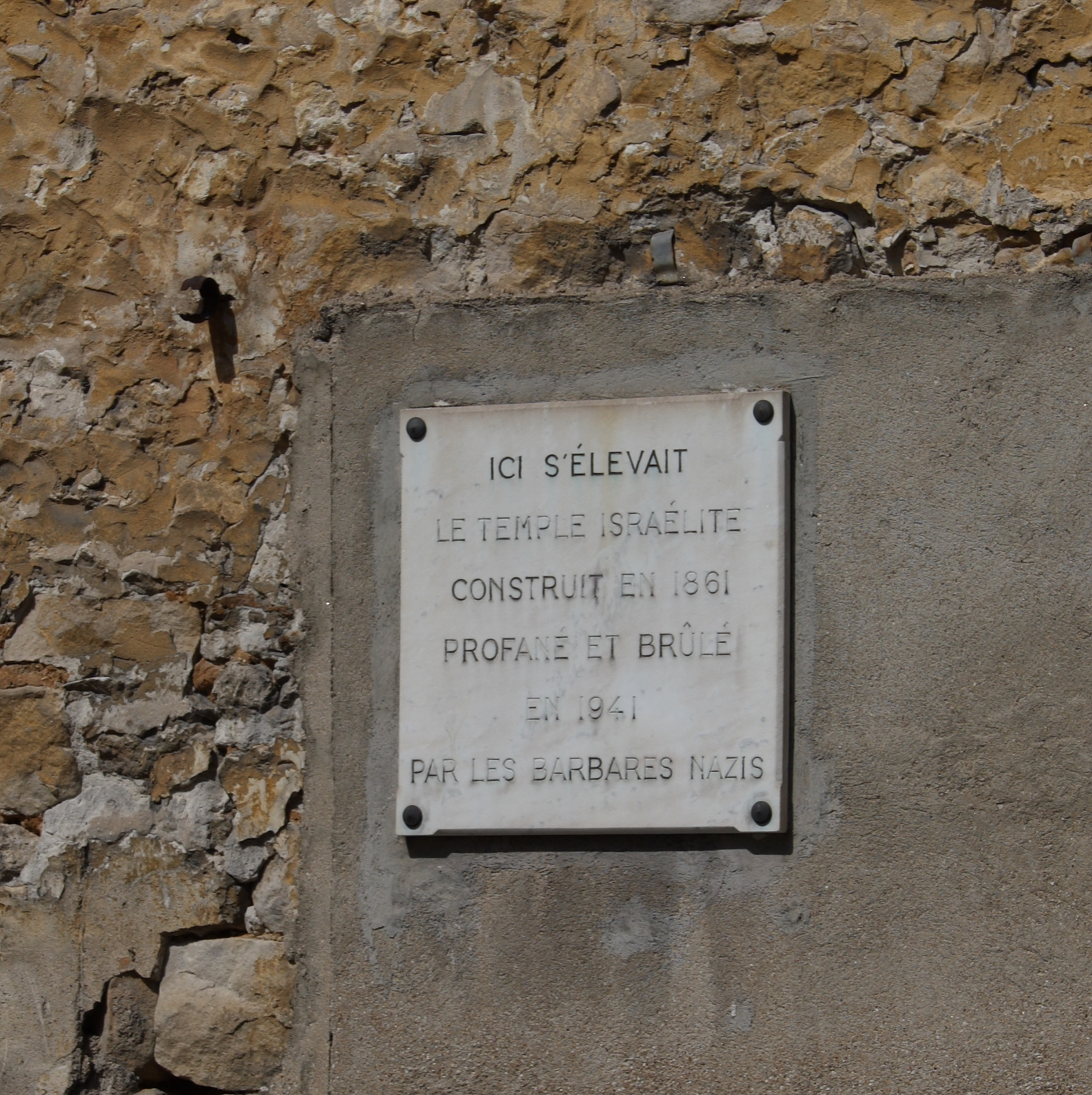
Memorial plaque to the first synagogue. Text: Here sat the Israelite Temple constructed in 1861, profaned and burned in 1941 by the Nazi barbarians.

== See also ==
- History of the Jews in France
- List of synagogues in France
