= Thomery station =

Railway station in Thomery, France

Thomery
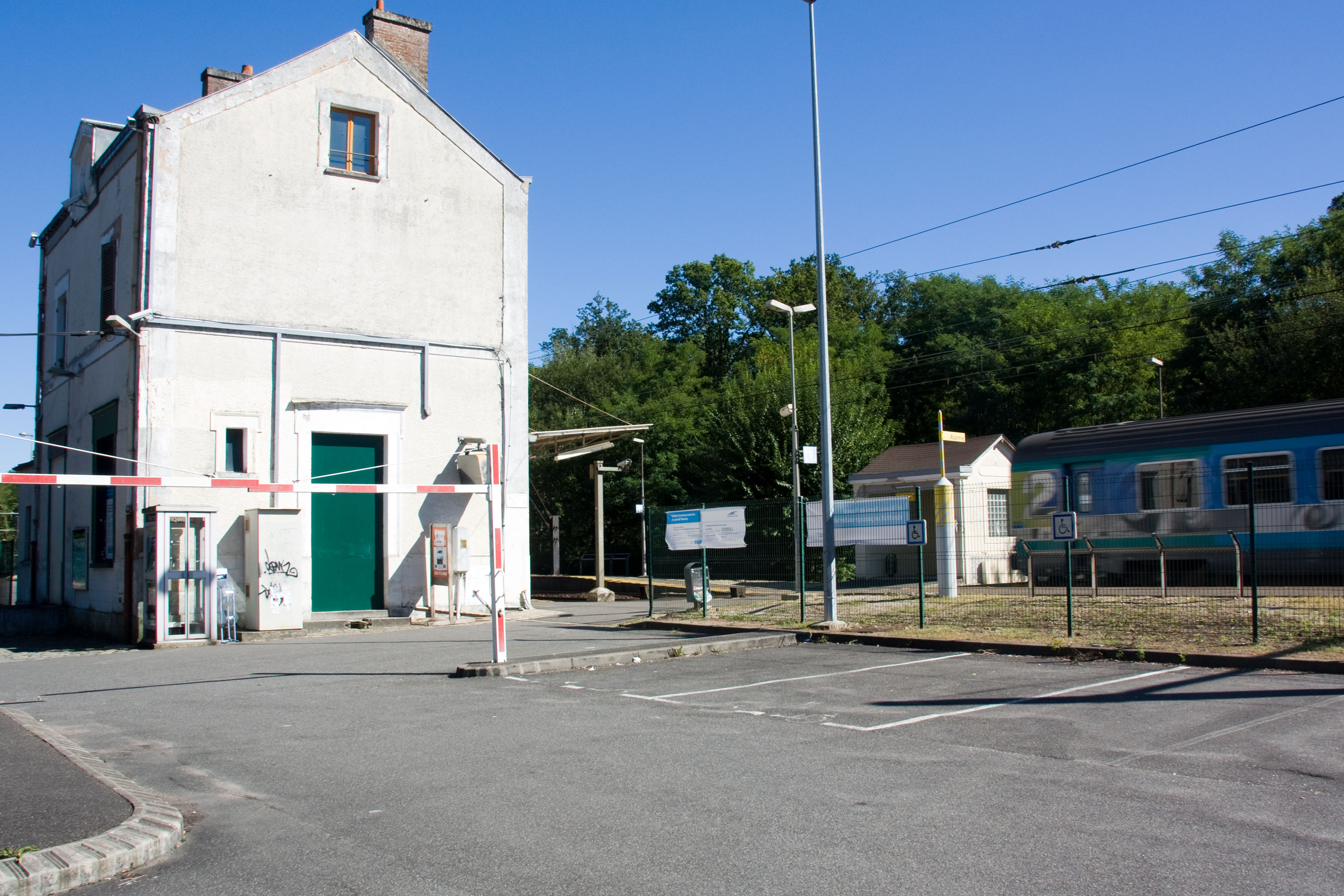
- Gare de Thomery

General information
- Location: Thomery, Seine-et-Marne, Île-de-France; France
- Coordinates: 48°23′39″N 2°45′49″E
- Owner: SNCF
- Operator: SNCF
- Line: Paris–Marseille railway
- Platforms: 2
- Tracks: 2

Other information
- Station code: 87682252
- Fare zone: 5

Services
| Preceding station | Transilien | Following station |
|---|---|---|
| Fontainebleau-Avon towards Paris-Lyon | Line R | Moret-Veneux-les-Sablons towards Montargis or Montereau |
Location

Thomery station (French: Gare de Thomery) is a railway station in Thomery, Île-de-France, France.

== The Station ==
The station is located on the Paris–Marseille railway line. The station is served by Transilien line R (Paris-Gare de Lyon).

The station was designed by the architect François-Alexis Cendrier, one of many he worked on for the railroad company Chemins de fer de Paris à Lyon et à la Méditerranée.

== Train services ==
The following services currently call at Thomery:

- local service (Transilien R) Paris–Melun–Montereau
- local service (Transilien R) Paris–Melun–Montargis

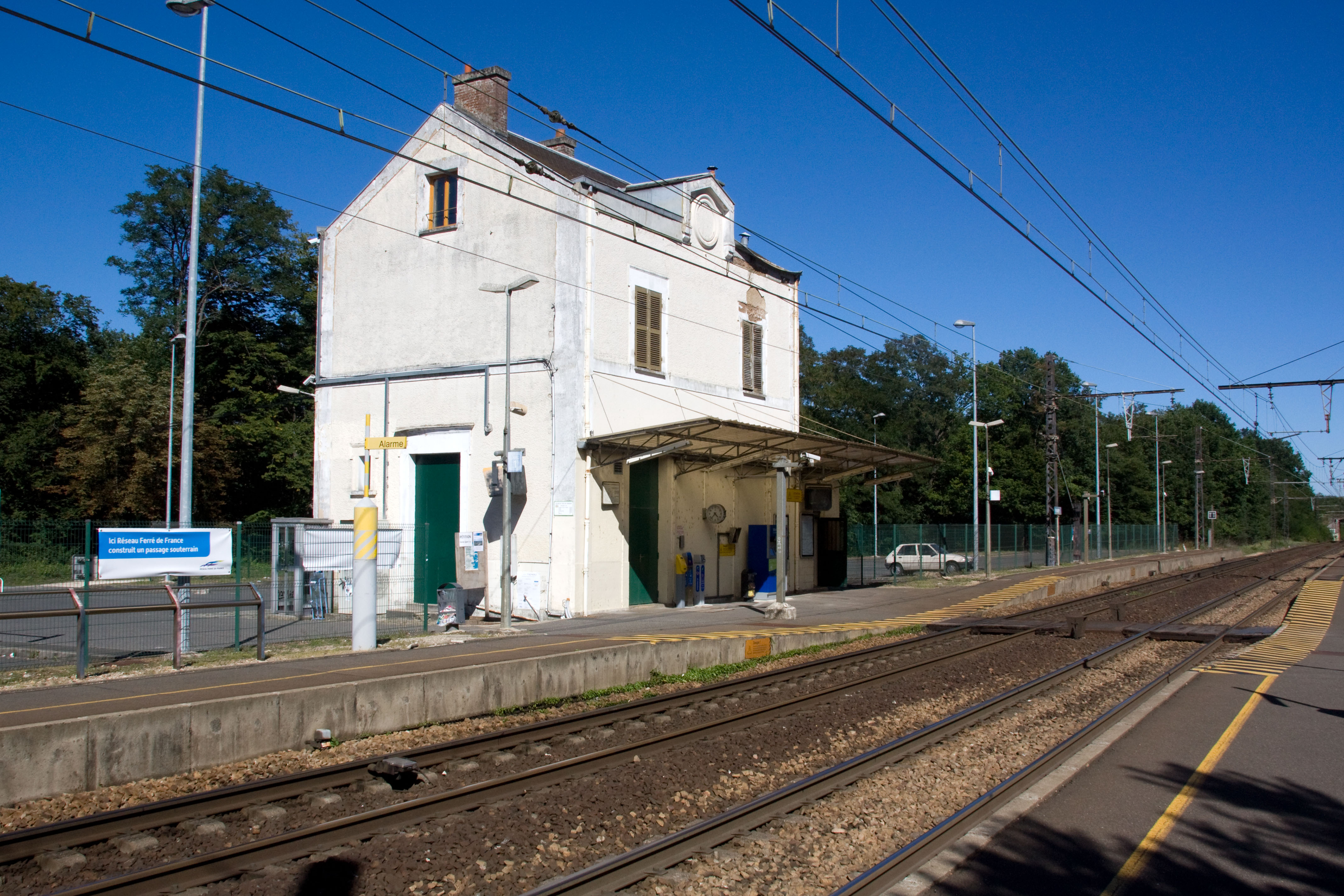
The station

== See also ==
- Transilien Paris–Lyon
