= Raoul Anglès =

French politician (1887–1967)

Raoul Anglès (21 October 1887 – 9 February 1967) was a French politician.

Anglès was born at Fontainebleau. He represented the Radical Party (from 1914 to 1919) and the Republican-Socialist Party (from 1919 to 1924) in the Chamber of Deputies.
