= Corbigny station =

Railway station in Bourgogne-Franche-Comté, France

Corbigny
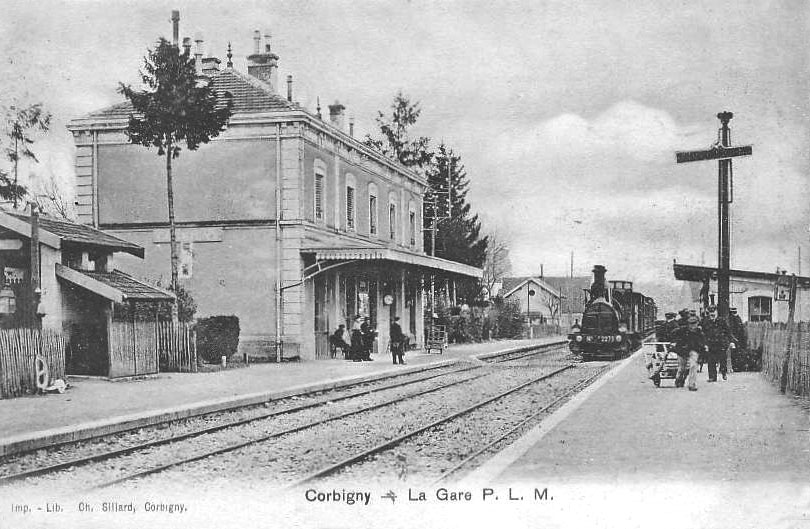
- Corbigny station in 1900

General information
- Location: Corbigny, Nièvre, Bourgogne-Franche-Comté, France
- Coordinates: 47°15′17″N 3°40′42″E
- Line: Clamecy-Gilly-sur-Loire railway
- Platforms: 2
- Tracks: 2

Other information
- Station code: 87696617

History
- Opened: 1878

Services
Preceding station	TER Bourgogne-Franche-Comté	Following station
Flez-Cuzy-Tannay towards Laroche-Migennes	TER	Terminus
Location

Corbigny is a railway station in Corbigny, Bourgogne-Franche-Comté, France. The station is located on the Clamecy-Gilly-sur-Loire railway. The station is served by TER (local) services operated by the SNCF. Between 1901 and 1939 there was a metre gauge railway operating from Corbigny to Saulieu, a distance of 76 km.

== Train services ==
The following train services serve the station as of 2022:

- local service (TER Bourgogne-Franche-Comté) Laroche-Migennes - Auxerre - Corbigny
