= Laroche–Migennes station =

Railway station in Migennes, France

Coordinates: 47°57′40″N 3°30′47″E

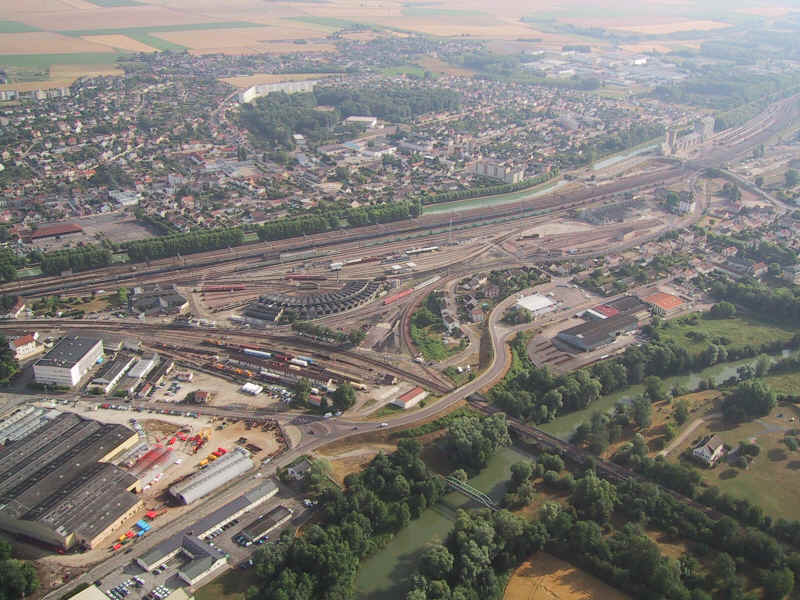

Laroche-Migennes station (French: Gare de Laroche-Migennes) is a railway station serving the towns Migennes and Laroche-Saint-Cydroine, Yonne department, central France. It lies at the junction of the Paris–Marseille railway with the Laroche-Migennes–Cosne railway. The station is served by regional trains towards Dijon, Paris, Auxerre, Corbigny and Avallon.

Preceding station	TER Bourgogne-Franche-Comté	Following station
Chemilly-Appoigny towards Auxerre	TER	Saint-Florentin-Vergigny towards Dijon
Terminus	TER	Auxerre towards Corbigny
Joigny towards Paris-Bercy	TER	Auxerre towards Avallon
Joigny towards Paris-Bercy	TER	Saint-Florentin-Vergigny towards Dijon
Joigny towards Paris-Lyon	TER	Terminus
