= Transilien Line R =

Suburban rail service around Paris

Line R

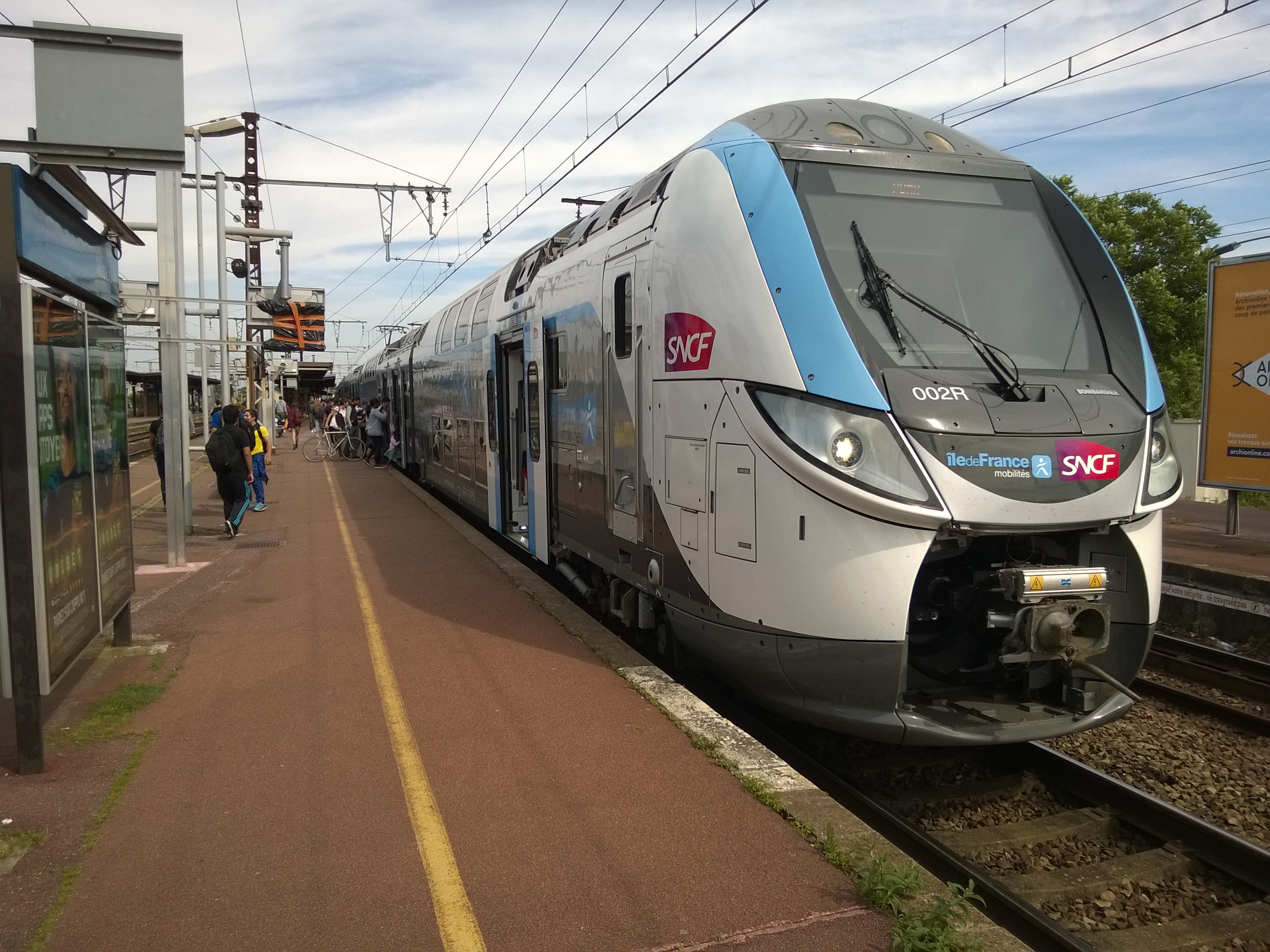
- Regio 2N operating a Montereau to Paris (via Moret) service at Melun station

Overview
- Termini: Paris-Gare-de-Lyon; Montargis Montereau
- Stations: 25

Service
- Type: Commuter rail
- System: Transilien
- Operator: SNCF
- Depot: Villeneuve-Saint-Georges
- Rolling stock: Z5600, Z20500, Z 57000
- Daily ridership: 55,000

History
- Opened: 3 January 1849 (first sections); 31 December 2004 (recreated as Line R)

Technical
- Line length: 164 km (102 mi)
- Track gauge: 1,435 mm (4 ft 8 1/2 in)

Transilien Line R is a railway line of the Paris Transilien suburban rail network. The trains on this line travel between Paris-Gare-de-Lyon in central Paris, as well as from Melun station in the suburbs, and the south-east of Île-de-France region. Transilien services from Paris-Gare-de-Lyon are part of the SNCF Gare de Lyon rail network. The line has 60,000 passengers per weekday.

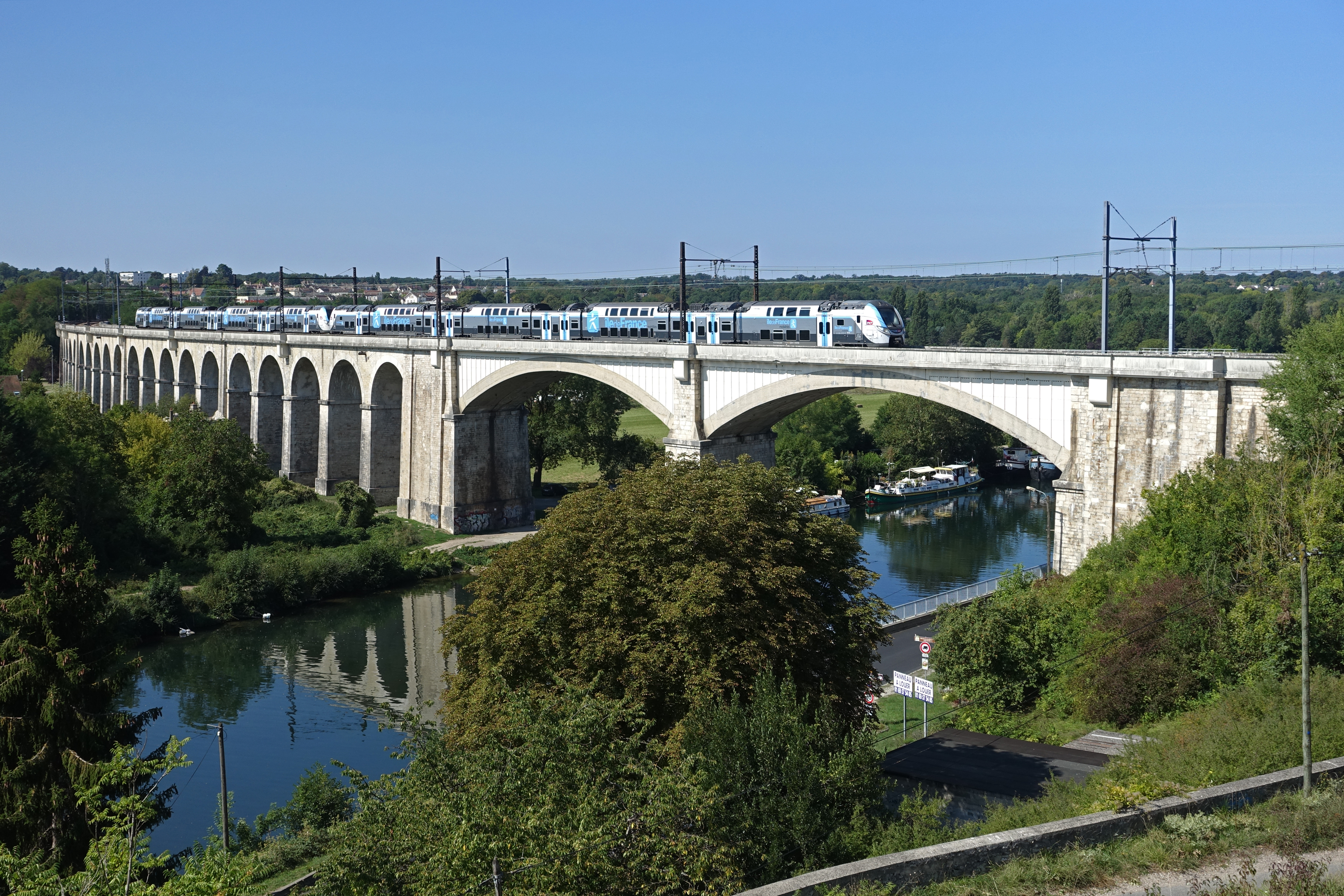
Regio2N train (class 57000) over the Viaduc de Saint-Mammes.

== Stations served ==
=== Montargis line ===
- Paris-Gare-de-Lyon
- Melun station
- Bois-le-Roi station
- Halte de Fontainebleau-Forêt (on weekends only)
- Fontainebleau–Avon station
- Thomery station
- Moret-Veneux-les-Sablons station
- Montigny-sur-Loing station
- Bourron-Marlotte–Grez station
- Nemours–Saint-Pierre station
- Bagneaux-sur-Loing station
- Souppes–Château-Landon station
- Dordives station
- Ferrières–Fontenay station
- Montargis station

=== Montereau line ===
- same route as the Montargis line between Paris-Gare-de-Lyon and Moret-Veneux-les-Sablons
- Saint-Mammès station
- Montereau station

=== Montereau line (via Héricy) ===
- Melun station
- Livry-sur-Seine station
- Chartrettes station
- Fontaine-le-Port station
- Héricy station
- Vulaines-sur-Seine–Samoreau station
- Champagne-sur-Seine station
- Vernou-sur-Seine station
- La Grande-Paroisse station
- Montereau station

== Services ==
There are three services, which are Paris-Gare-de-Lyon–Melun–Montargis, Paris-Gare-de-Lyon–Melun–Fontainebleau–Montereau and Melun–Héricy–Montereau. Like all other Transilien lines every train has a "name of service" consisting of four letters.

The first letter indicates the destination of the train. Trains to Montargis have a four-letter code beginning with G (GAMA, GAME, GAMO, GAMU, GOMO, GOMU), while those to Montereau have the first letter of the four always a K (KAMO, KOHO, KUMO). Trains to Paris-Gare de Lyon begin with P (POMA, POME, POMO, POMU, PUMA), which is also the first letter of the station's name. Those to Melun have a four-letter code beginning with Z (ZOHA).

The second letter indicates that the train might call at all stations, or at selected stations only. An "O" indicates an all stops train (French omnibus), as in this case of GOMO, which is an all stops train to Montargis.

Trains running via Héricy have the letter H as the third letter (KOHO is an example), while trains running via Moret-Veneux-les-Sablons have the letter M as the third letter (KUMO is an example).

== Rolling stock ==
The Transilien R line is operated by Z 5600, Z 20500 and Regio 2N trains. The rolling stock of the line is shared with that of the RER line D.

Since December 8, 2017, forty-eight Regio 2N trainsets have been progressively delivered to enable the redeployment of twenty-four Z 2N double-deck trainsets on the network's other lines, as well as the deletion of the stainless steel Z 5300 trainsets. The Syndicat des transports d'Île-de-France (STIF) decided to acquire them, during the Board of Directors meeting of December 11, 2013, so that they would completely renew the current fleet.

The Regio 2N trains will be 110 m long, double-decker, with 582 seats per train. At peak times, they will run in multiples of three units, offering 1,746 seats and a total of 3,120 per train, for a total length of 330 m. These trains will offer passengers a maximum number of seats, given the long journey times of up to 1.5 hours (including half an hour without a stop between Paris and Melun). On the other hand, unlike the TER versions, the Transilien fleet will have no toilets, which has provoked strong reactions from regular users of the line.

The total investment amounts to more than 900 million euros, including the order for 43 Francilien trains for the H, K and L lines of the Transilien network. It is financed in equal parts by STIF and SNCF under the STIF/SNCF contract. The first 42 units were ordered in December 2014 at a cost of €397 million, with delivery of the first elements scheduled for September 2017 and full equipment of the line by the end of 2018

=== Current fleet ===
| Trainset | Image | Type | Top speed | | Car | Number | Line/Route | Built |
| Trainset | Image | Type | mph | km/h | Car | Number | Line/Route | Built |
|---|---|---|---|---|---|---|---|---|
| Z2N Z5600 | | Z2n | | 140 | 6 | 9 | they run on the Line R occasionally or in case of shortage of Regio2n: Paris-Gare-de-Lyon–Melun–Montargis; Paris-Gare-de-Lyon–Melun–Fontainebleau–Montereau | 1982 - 1985 |
| Z2N Z20500 | | Z2n | | 140 | 5 | 134 (shared equipment with the RER D) | they run on the Line R occasionally or in case of shortage of Regio2n: Paris-Gare-de-Lyon–Melun–Montargis; Paris-Gare-de-Lyon–Melun–Fontainebleau–Montereau | 1988 - 1998 |
| Bombardier Regio2n (Z57000) | | Regio2n | | 160 | 7 | 61 (shared equipment with the RER D) | all branches of the Line R: Paris-Gare-de-Lyon–Melun–Montargis; Paris-Gare-de-Lyon–Melun–Fontainebleau–Montereau; Melun–Héricy–Montereau | 2014 - 2020 |

=== Past fleet ===
| Trainset | Image | Type | Top speed | | Car | Number | Line/Route | Built | |
| Trainset | Image | Type | mph | km/h | Car | Number | Line/Route | Built | |
|---|---|---|---|---|---|---|---|---|---|
| Z2N Z5300 | | Petit Gris | | 120 130 | 4 | | Melun–Héricy–Montereau | 1966 - 1975 | they were replaced by the Regio2n and were subsequently written off in 2018. |
| Z5600 | | Z2N | | 140 | | 7 | Paris-Gare-de-Lyon–Melun–Montargis; Paris-Gare-de-Lyon–Melun–Fontainebleau–Montereau | | some of them have been sent to the scrapyard following the arrival of the new Regio2n trains that succeeded them. However, some elements have been kept on the line to run in case of breakdowns or insufficient number of Regio2n during peak hour. |

== See also ==
- List of Transilien stations
