= Halte de Fontainebleau-Forêt =

Railway halt in Fontainebleau Forest, France

Fontainebleau-Forêt
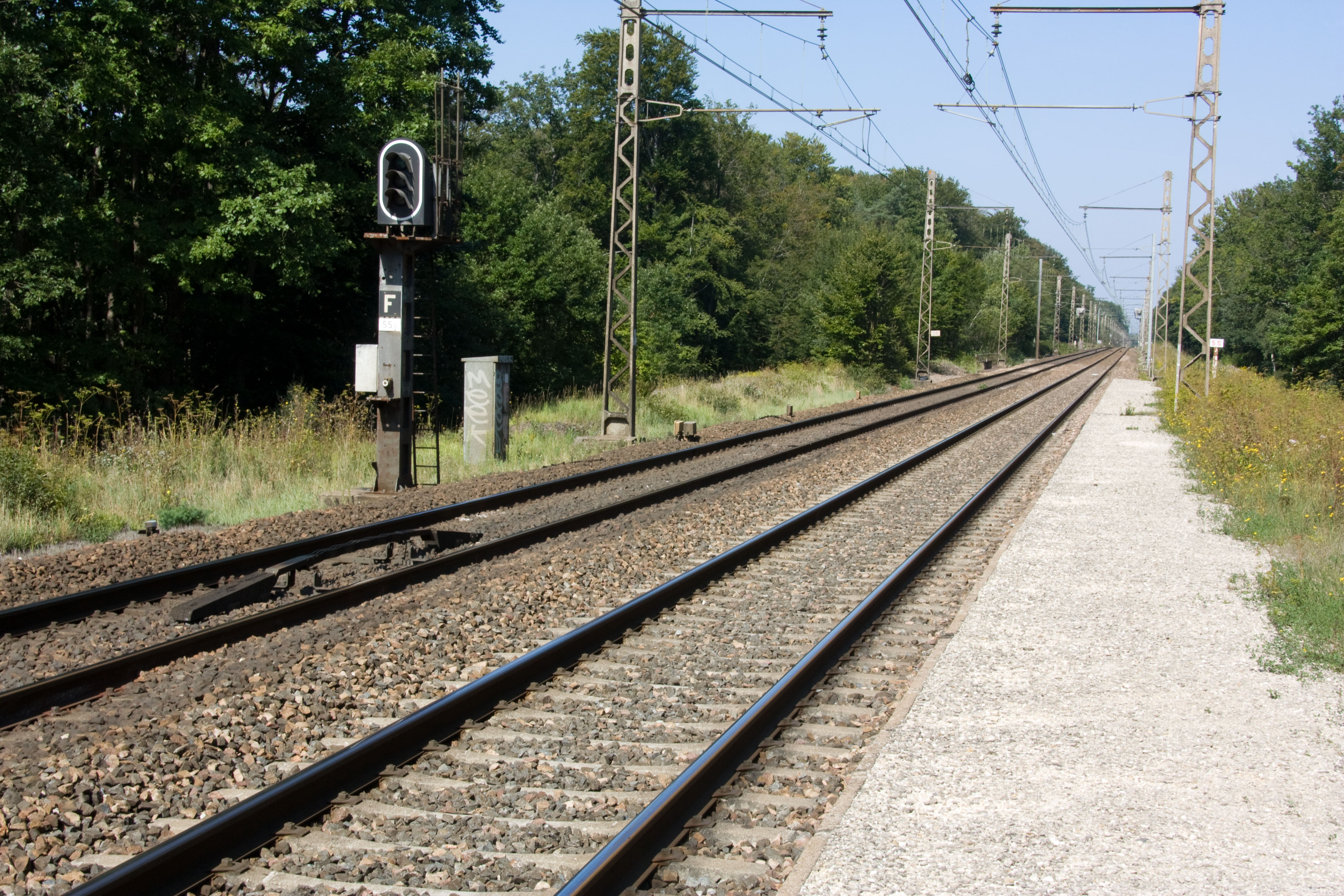

General information
- Location: Fontainebleau, Seine-et-Marne, Île-de-France; France
- Coordinates: 48°26′52″N 2°43′46″E
- System: Halt
- Line: Paris–Marseille railway
- Platforms: 1
- Tracks: 2

Other information
- Fare zone: 5

History
- Opened: 1950

Services
| Preceding station | Transilien | Following station |
|---|---|---|
| Bois-le-Roi towards Paris-Lyon | Line R | Fontainebleau-Avon towards Montargis |
Location

The halte de Fontainebleau-Forêt is a railway halt on the Paris–Marseille railway line in the Forest of Fontainebleau, operated by SNCF.

The service is limited to a few Transilien trains in the morning of Saturdays, Sundays and public holidays.

The station is halfway between Bois-Le-Roi and Fontainebleau – Avon stations, some 4 km away.

== Passenger service ==
The halt has no building or public markings, and its only platform is on the Fontainebleau-bound direction (Track 1). Passengers can leave the train, but not board. The train conductor is entirely responsible for its operation, and there is a mirror at the end of the platform for train staff to check that passengers are not descending before starting the train. The halt is mainly used by people hiking through the forest.

There is no official signage, and the stop is not marked on official train maps. It is sometimes, but not always, indicated on train station screens as « Arrêt en forêt » (Forest stop).

As of 14 February 2022, the stop is serviced by 2 trains from the Transilien Line R, only Fontainebleau-bound, on Saturdays, Sundays and public holidays (trains leaving at 8:16 and 9:16 from Paris-Gare-de-Lyon).

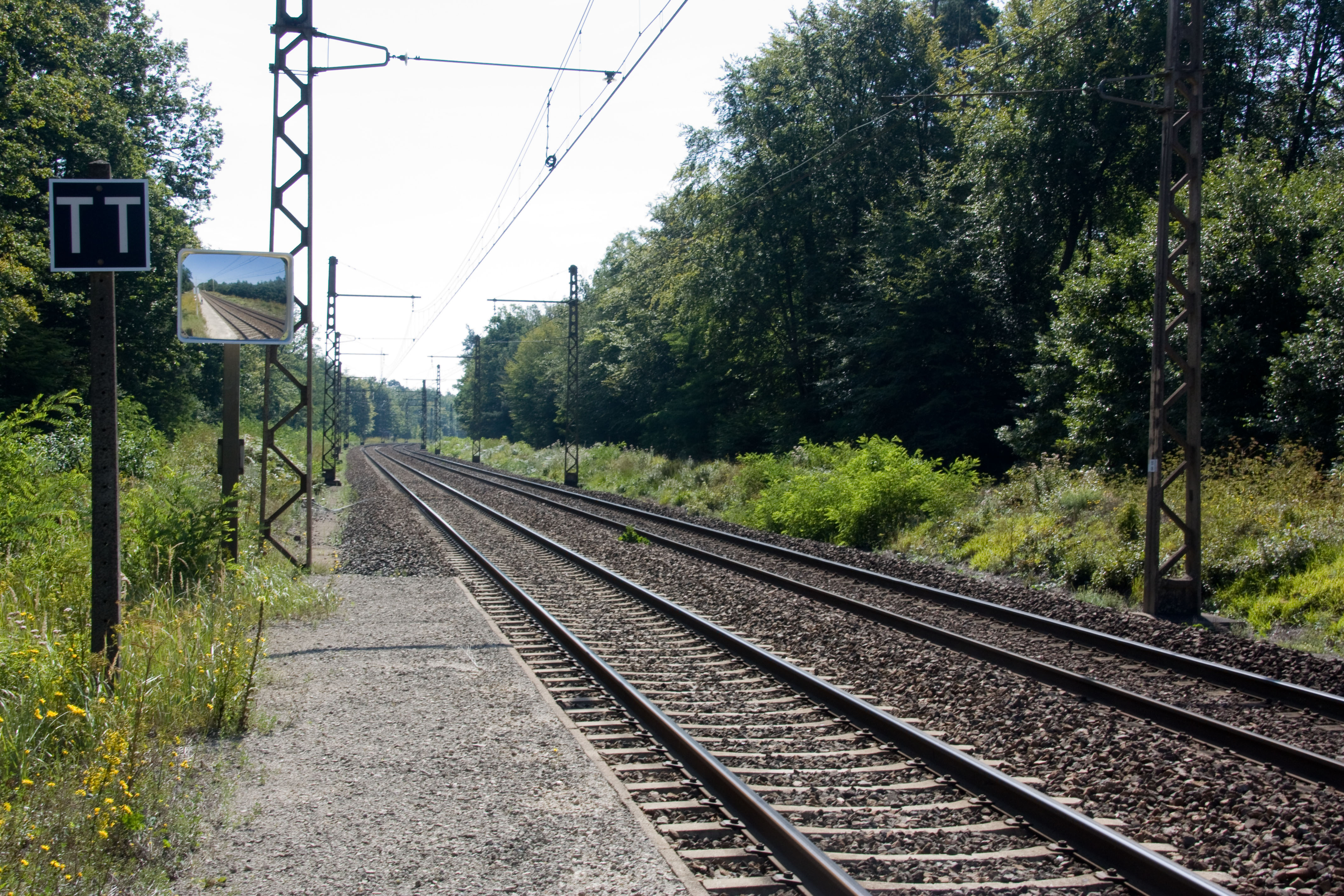
TT (tête du train) sign and mirror, on the south side

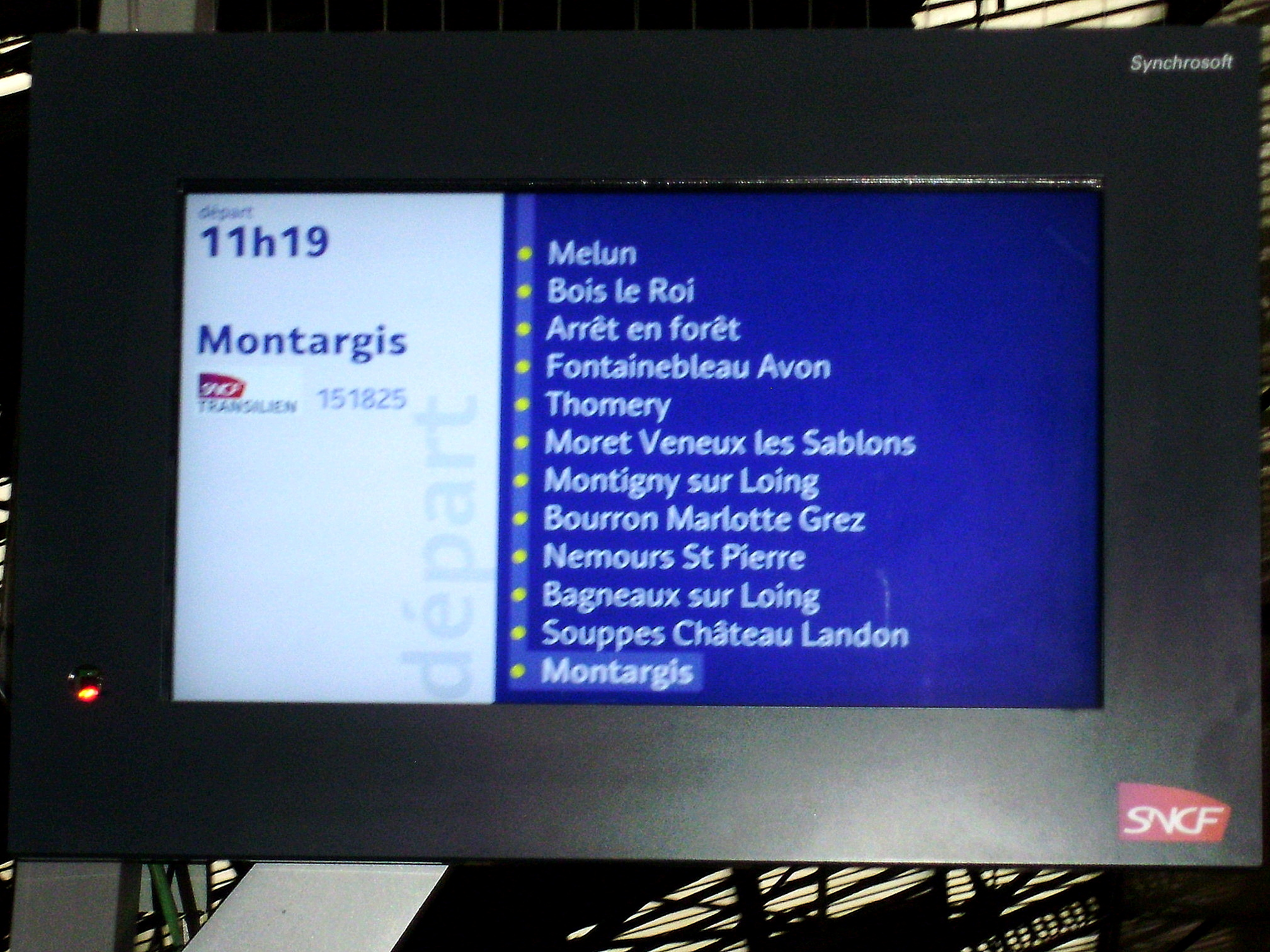
The halt is the third stop
