= Bourron-Marlotte – Grez station =

Railway station in Bourron-Marlotte, France

Bourron-Marlotte Grez
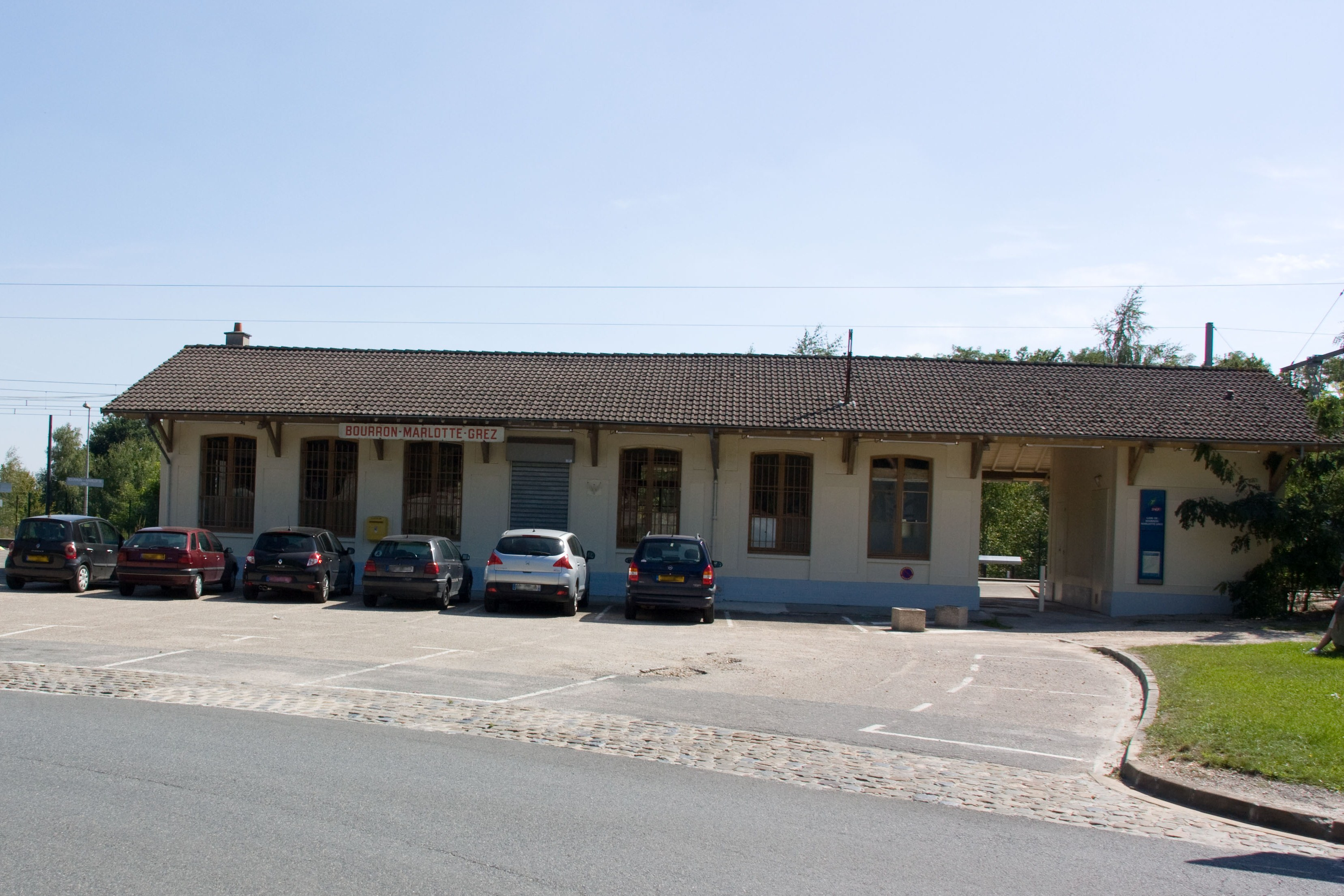
- Gare de Bourron-Marlotte–Grez

General information
- Location: Bourron-Marlotte and Grez-sur-Loing, Seine-et-Marne, Île-de-France; France
- Coordinates: 48°19′57″N 2°41′31″E
- Line: Moret-Lyon railway
- Platforms: 2
- Tracks: 2

Other information
- Station code: 87684118
- Fare zone: 5

History
- Opened: 1860

Services
Preceding station	Transilien	Following station
Montigny-sur-Loing towards Paris-Lyon	Line R	Nemours–Saint-Pierre towards Montargis
Location

Bourron-Marlotte–Grez is a railway station between Bourron-Marlotte and Grez-sur-Loing, Île-de-France, France.

== The station ==
The station opened in 1860 and is on the Moret–Lyon railway. The station is served by Transilien line R (Paris-Gare de Lyon) operated by SNCF.

== Gallery ==
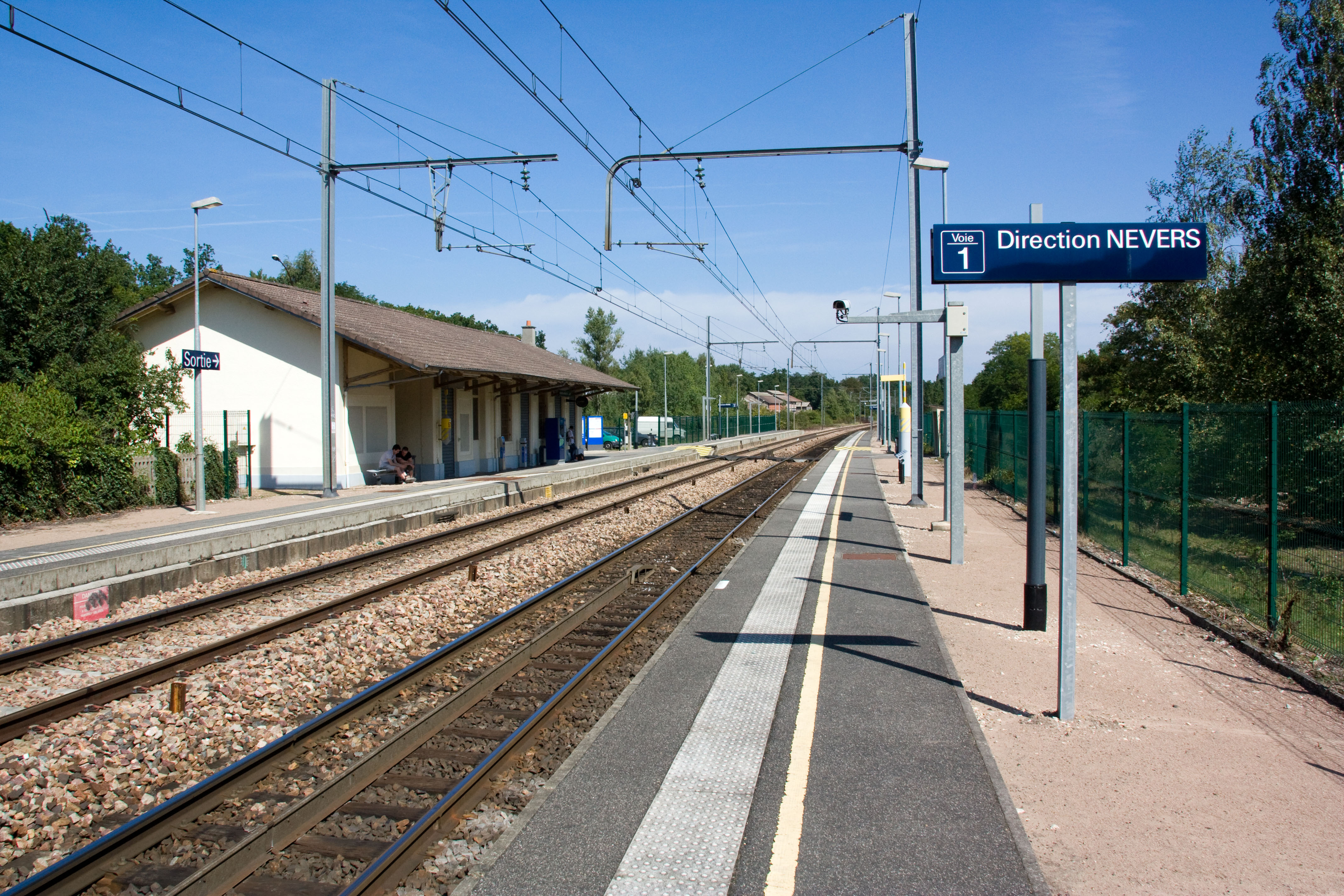
The station

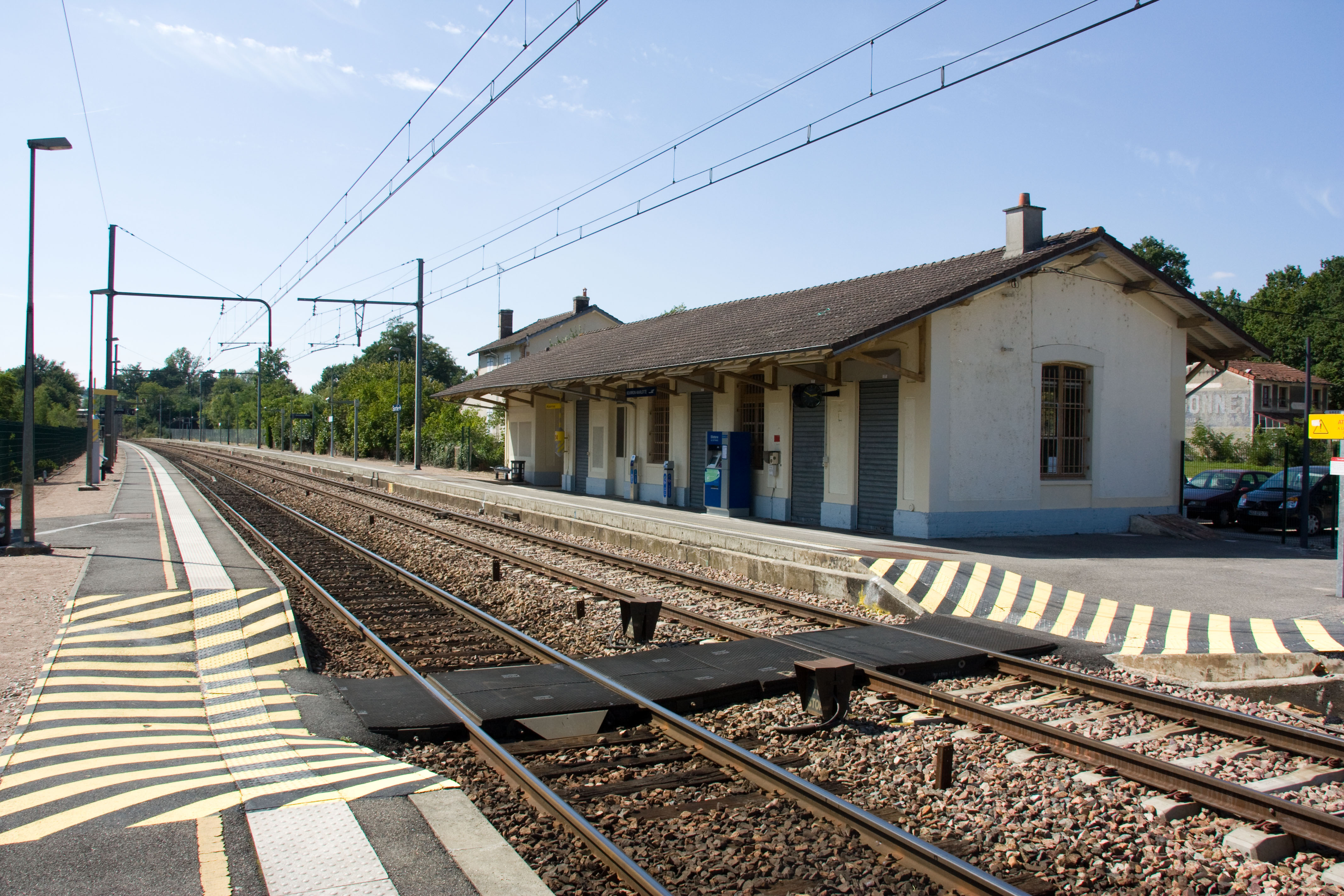
The station

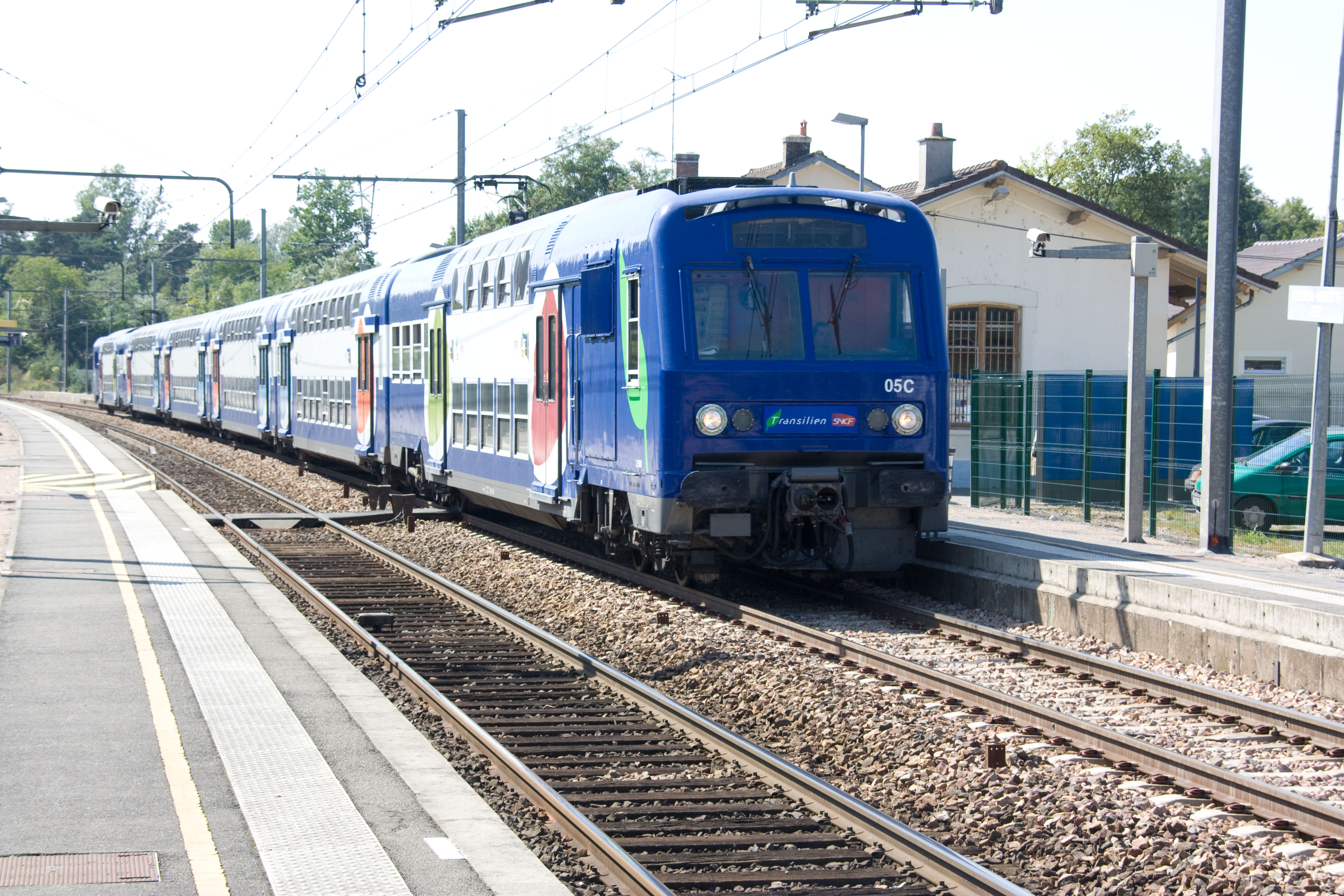
Z 8809/10 arrives at the station for Paris.

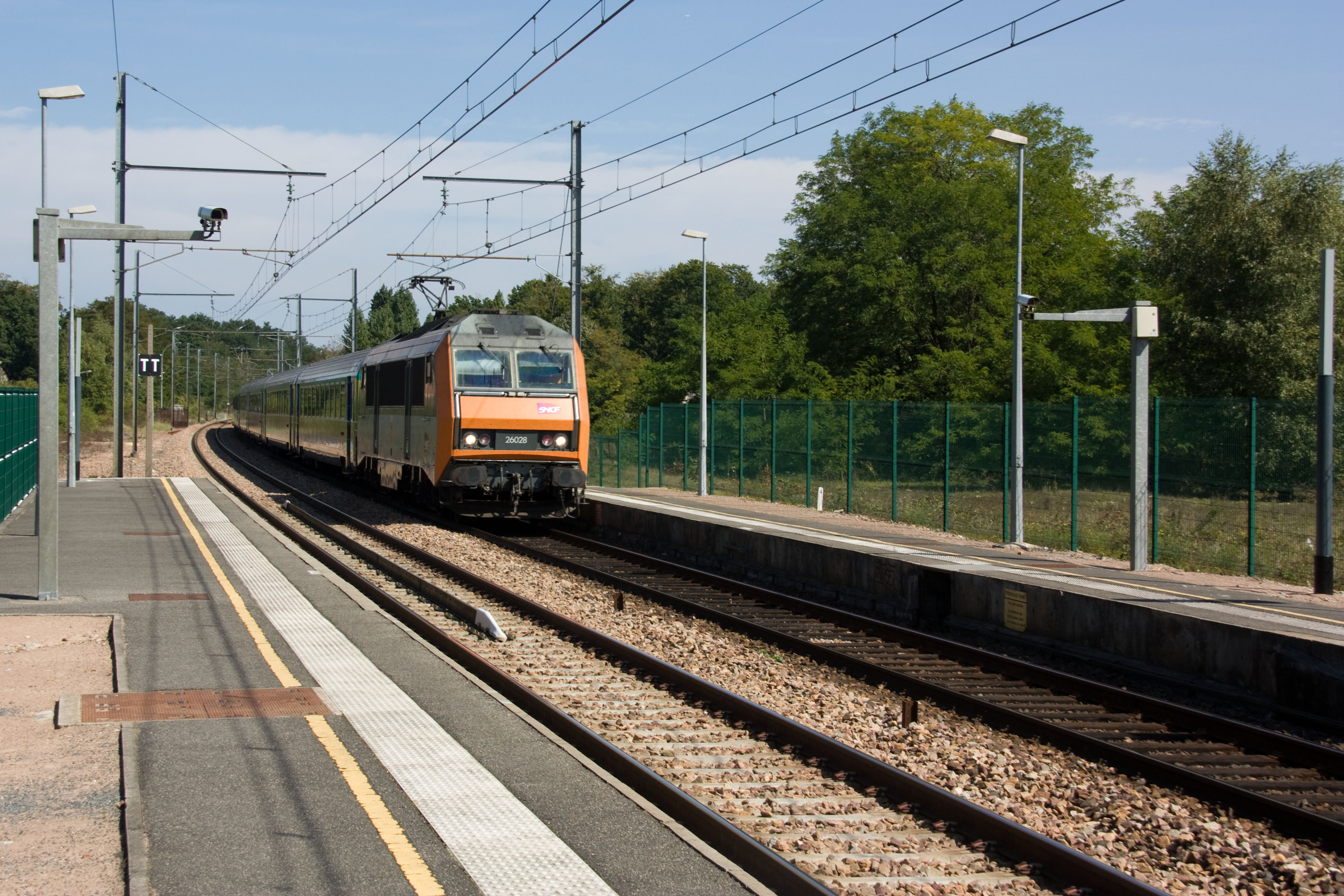
An express, pulled by BB 26028 passes through the station towards the south.

== See also ==
- Transilien Paris–Lyon
