= Dordives station =

Railway station in Dordives, France

Dordives
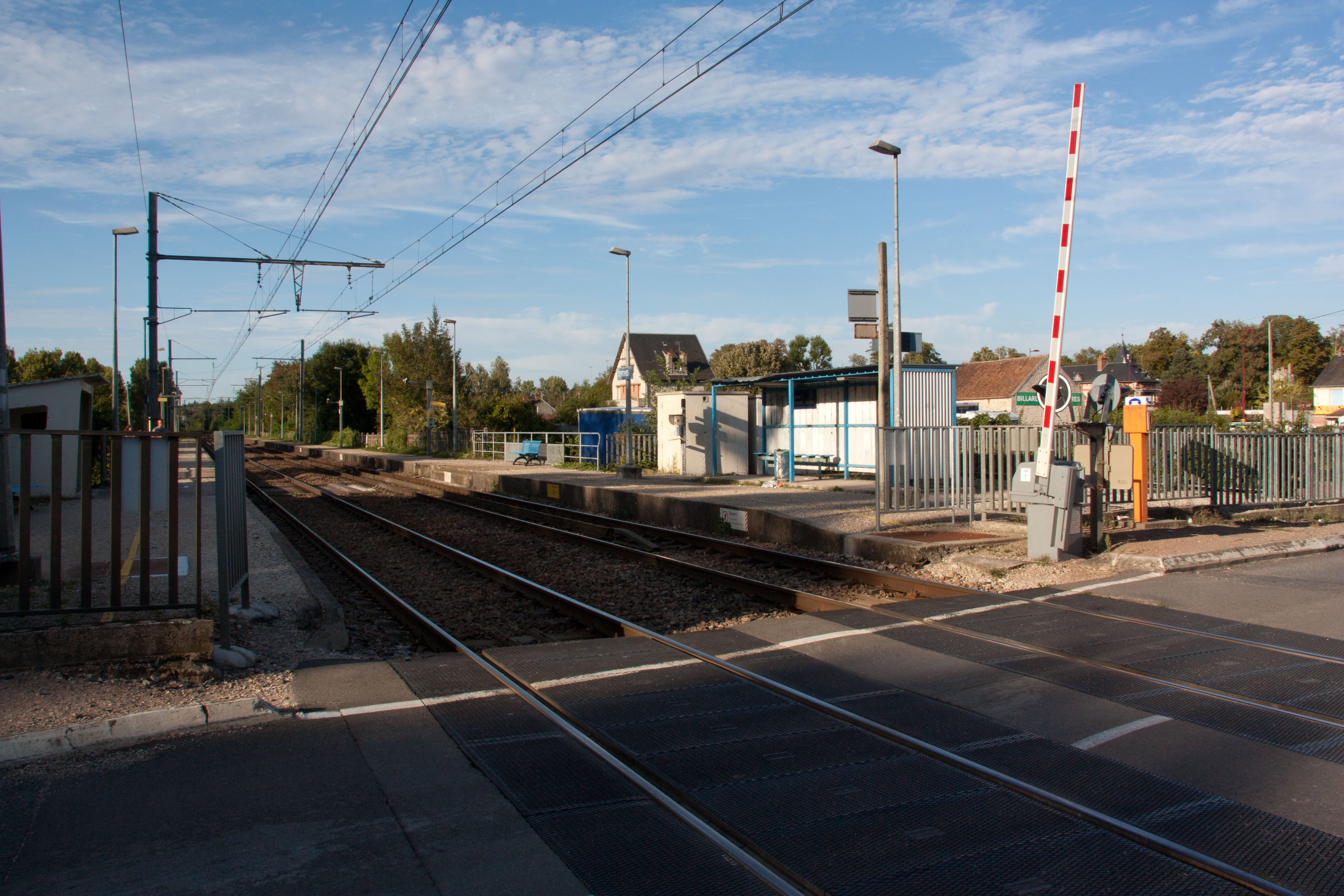

General information
- Location: Avenue Saintamon; 45680 Dordives; Loiret; France
- Coordinates: 48°08′53″N 2°45′47″E
- Line: Moret-Lyon railway
- Platforms: 2
- Tracks: 2

Other information
- Station code: 87684233

Passengers
- 2016: 4 083

Services
Preceding station	Transilien	Following station
Souppes–Château-Landon towards Paris-Lyon	Line R	Ferrières-Fontenay towards Montargis
Location

Gare de Dordives is a railway station in Dordives, Centre-Val de Loire, France. The station is located on the Moret–Lyon railway. The station is served by Transilien line R (Paris-Gare de Lyon to Montargis) operated by SNCF.

== See also ==
- Transilien Paris–Lyon
