= Bagneaux-sur-Loing station =

Railway station in Bagneaux-sur-Loing, France

Bagneaux-sur-Loing
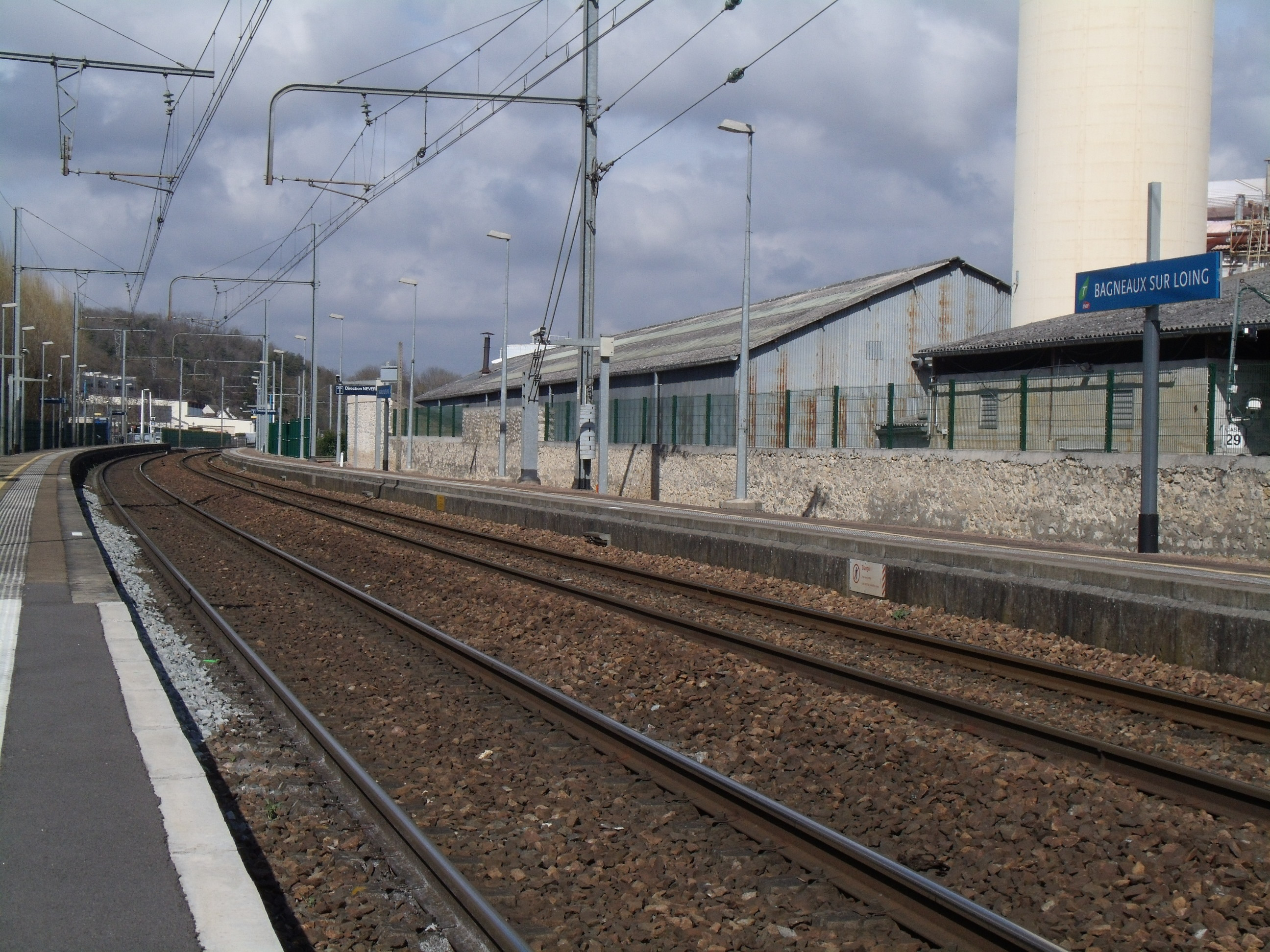

General information
- Location: Bagneaux-sur-Loing, Seine-et-Marne, Île-de-France; France
- Coordinates: 48°13′46″N 2°42′15″E
- Line: Moret–Lyon railway
- Platforms: 2
- Tracks: 2

Other information
- Station code: 87684191
- Fare zone: 5

Services
Preceding station	Transilien	Following station
Nemours–Saint-Pierre towards Paris-Lyon	Line R	Souppes-Château-Landon towards Montargis
Location

Bagneaux-sur-Loing is a railway station in Bagneaux-sur-Loing, Île-de-France, France. The station is on the Moret–Lyon railway. The station is served by the Transilien line R (Paris–Gare de Lyon) operated by SNCF.

== See also ==
- Transilien Paris–Lyon
