= Souppes – Château-Landon station =

Railway station in Souppes-sur-Loing, France

Souppes Château-Landon
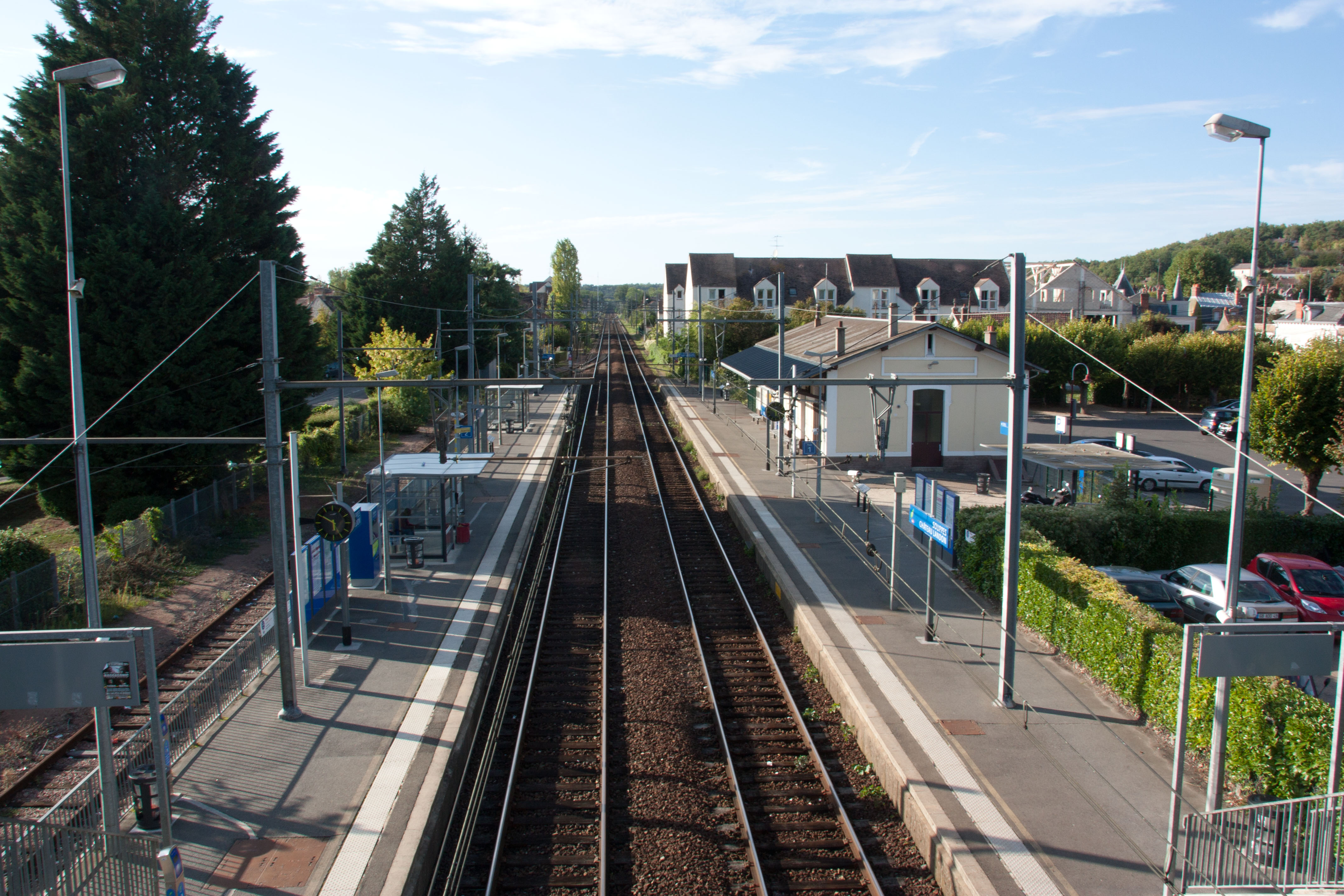

General information
- Location: Souppes-sur-Loing, Seine-et-Marne, Île-de-France; France
- Coordinates: 48°16′03″N 2°41′08″E
- Line: Moret-Lyon railway
- Platforms: 2
- Tracks: 2

Other information
- Station code: 87684217
- Fare zone: 5

Services
Preceding station	Transilien	Following station
Bagneaux-sur-Loing towards Paris-Lyon	Line R	Dordives towards Montargis
Location

Souppes–Château-Landon is a railway station in Souppes-sur-Loing, Île-de-France, France. The station is located on the Moret–Lyon railway. The station is served by Transilien line R (from Paris-Gare de Lyon to Montargis) operated by SNCF.

== See also ==
- Transilien Paris–Lyon
