= Bagneaux-sur-Loing =

- Commune
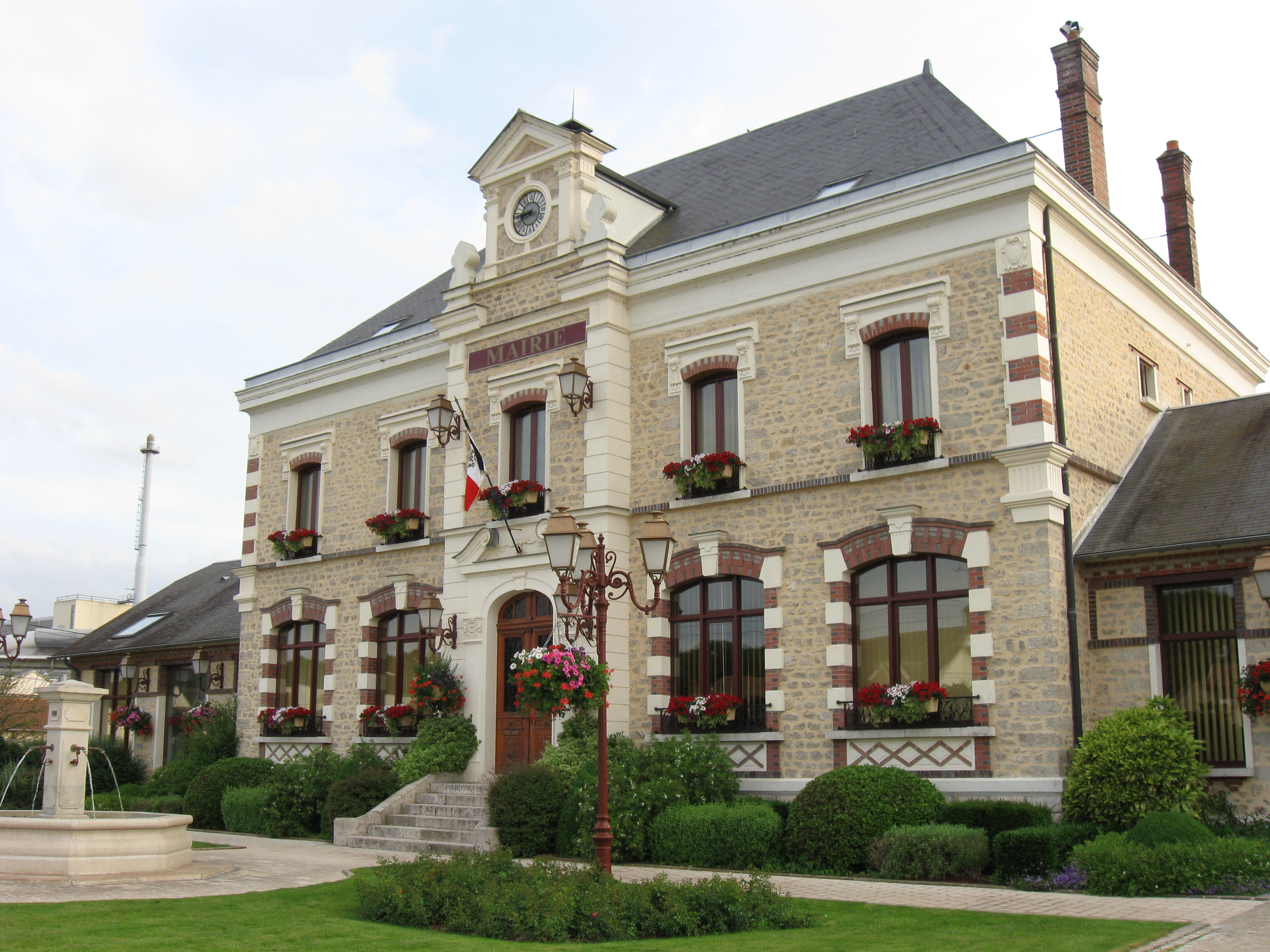
- The town hall in Bagneaux-sur-Loing

- Coat of arms
- Location of Bagneaux-sur-Loing
- Location within France Location within Île-de-France (region)
- Coordinates: 48°13′49″N 2°42′23″E
- Country: France
- Region: Île-de-France
- Department: Seine-et-Marne
- Arrondissement: Fontainebleau
- Canton: Nemours

Government
  - Mayor (2020–2026): Claude Jamet
- Area^{1}: 5.26 km^{2} (2.03 sq mi)
- Highest elevation: 126 m (413 ft)
- Lowest elevation: 60 m (200 ft)
- Population (2023): 1,570
  - Density: 298/km^{2} (773/sq mi)
- Time zone: UTC+01:00 (CET)
  - Summer (DST): UTC+02:00 (CEST)
- INSEE/Postal code: 77016 /77167
- ^{1} French Land Register data, which excludes lakes, ponds, glaciers > 1 km^{2} (0.386 sq mi or 247 acres) and river estuaries.

Bagneaux-sur-Loing (French pronunciation: [baɲo syʁ lwɛ̃], literally Bagneaux on Loing) is a commune in the Seine-et-Marne department in the Île-de-France region in north-central France. Bagneaux-sur-Loing station has rail connections to Montargis, Melun and Paris.

== Demographics ==
The inhabitants are called Balnéolitains.

== See also ==
- Communes of the Seine-et-Marne department
