= Souppes-sur-Loing =

Commune in Île-de-France, France

- Commune
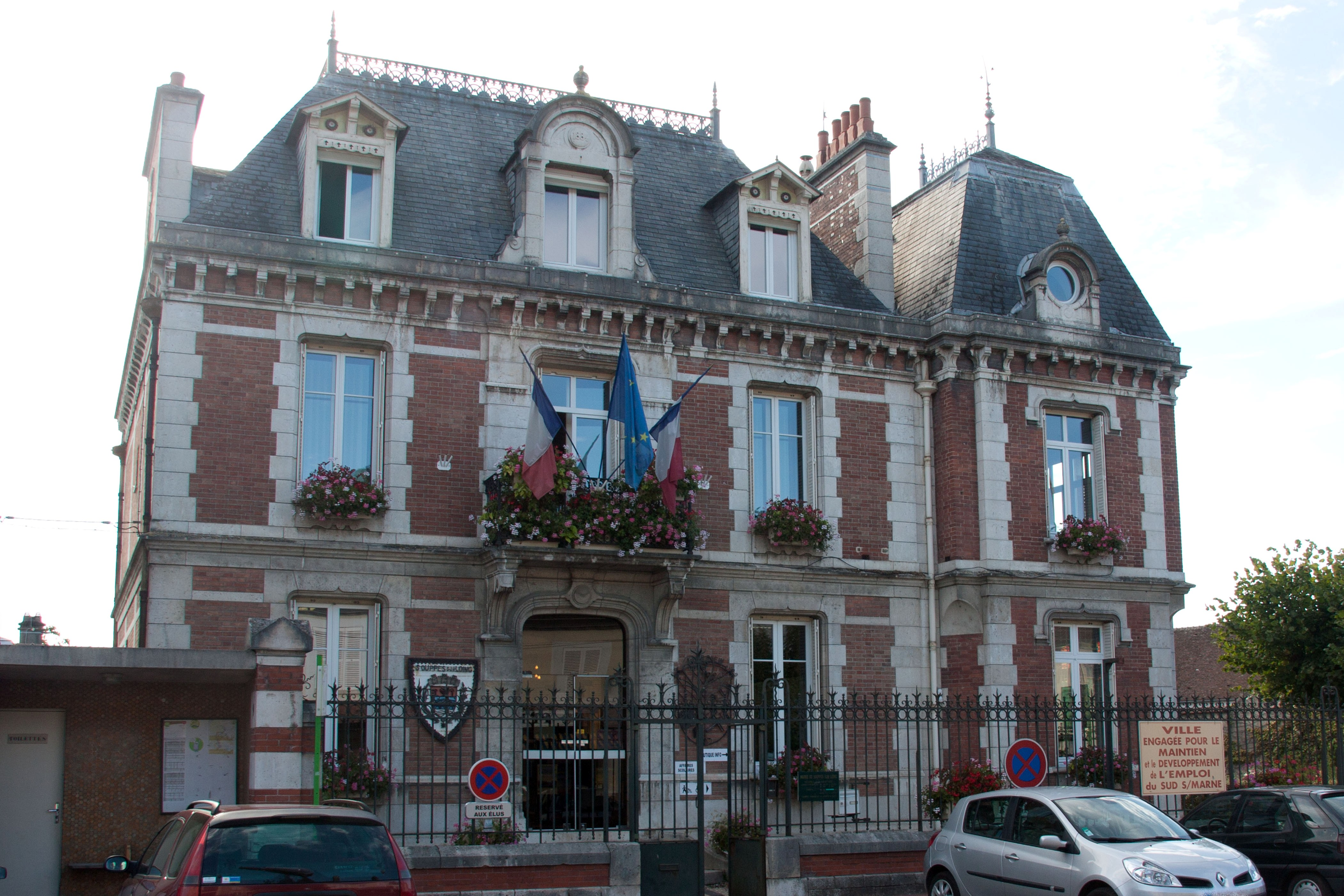
- The town hall in Souppes-sur-Loing

- Coat of arms
- Location of Souppes-sur-Loing
- Location within France Location within Île-de-France (region)
- Coordinates: 48°11′02″N 2°44′10″E
- Country: France
- Region: Île-de-France
- Department: Seine-et-Marne
- Arrondissement: Fontainebleau
- Canton: Nemours
- Intercommunality: CC Gâtinais-Val de Loing

Government
  - Mayor (2020–2026): Pierre Babut
- Area^{1}: 27.63 km^{2} (10.67 sq mi)
- Highest elevation: 130 m (430 ft)
- Lowest elevation: 62 m (203 ft)
- Population (2023): 4,952
  - Density: 179.2/km^{2} (464.2/sq mi)
- Time zone: UTC+01:00 (CET)
  - Summer (DST): UTC+02:00 (CEST)
- INSEE/Postal code: 77458 /77460
- ^{1} French Land Register data, which excludes lakes, ponds, glaciers > 1 km^{2} (0.386 sq mi or 247 acres) and river estuaries.

Souppes-sur-Loing (French pronunciation: [sup syʁ lwɛ̃], literally Souppes on Loing) is a commune in the Seine-et-Marne department at the southern edge of the Île-de-France region in north-central France. The town of Souppes-sur-Loing has 4,952 inhabitants (2023), and is located 86 miles (99.1 kilometers) south of Paris. It has a station, Souppes – Château-Landon, on the Transilien suburban railroad line between the Gare de Lyon railway station in Paris station and the city of Montargis, and many of the town's residents commute to work in Paris.

The historic monuments of the town include a church and vestiges of monastery of the Cistercian Order from the 12th century. In the 19th and early 20th century the town was known for the creamy white limestone from the Souppes quarry, which was used to build the Basilica of Montmartre and several other monuments in Paris. The major economic enterprise of Souppes today is a large sugar mill and distillery which processes sugar beets from the surrounding farmlands.

== Geography ==
Souppes-sur-Loing is located on the river Loing, a tributary of the Seine, and on the Loing canal. It has a municipal water park, with facilities for swimming and for kayaking and canoeing on the river. The river is also home to many varieties of birds, including swan and heron.

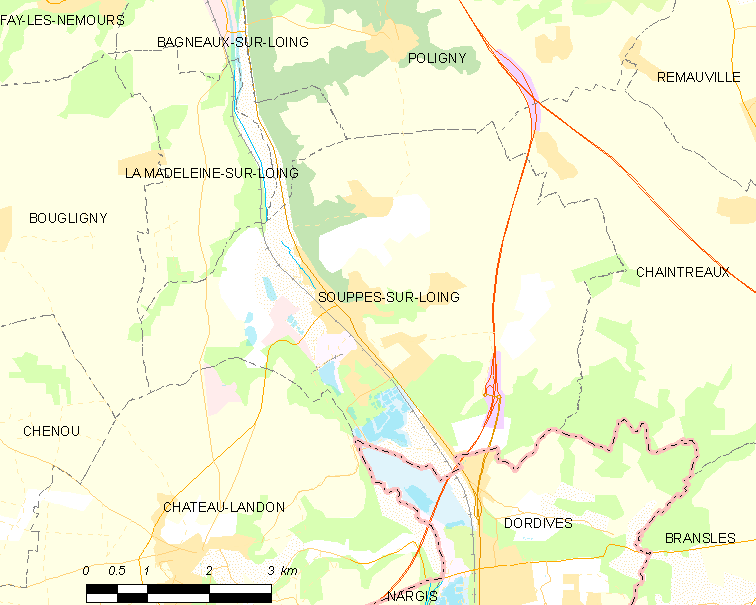
A map of the Commune of Souppes-sur-Loing

== History ==
=== Prehistory and the Middle Ages ===
The Valley of the Loing river has been inhabited since the Neolithic period. A group of eight polissoires, large, exceptionally-hard boulders on which early inhabitants made tools and weapons, was discovered near Souppes in the 19th century, and is classified as a historic monument by the French Ministry of Culture. Traces of Gallo-Roman settlements have been found at Boulay, Croisiere, and Beaumoulin.

The town is first mentioned in a document dated 1090, which recorded the donation of a church called Saint-Marie de Souppes, attached to the Priory of Saint Clair. Another priory, that of Notre Dame de Boulay, was founded shortly afterwards, as was a Cistercian Abbey, Saint Marie de Cercanceaux. The present church of Souppes, also attached to the Priory of Saint Clair. was built at the end of the 12th century in the new Gothic style.

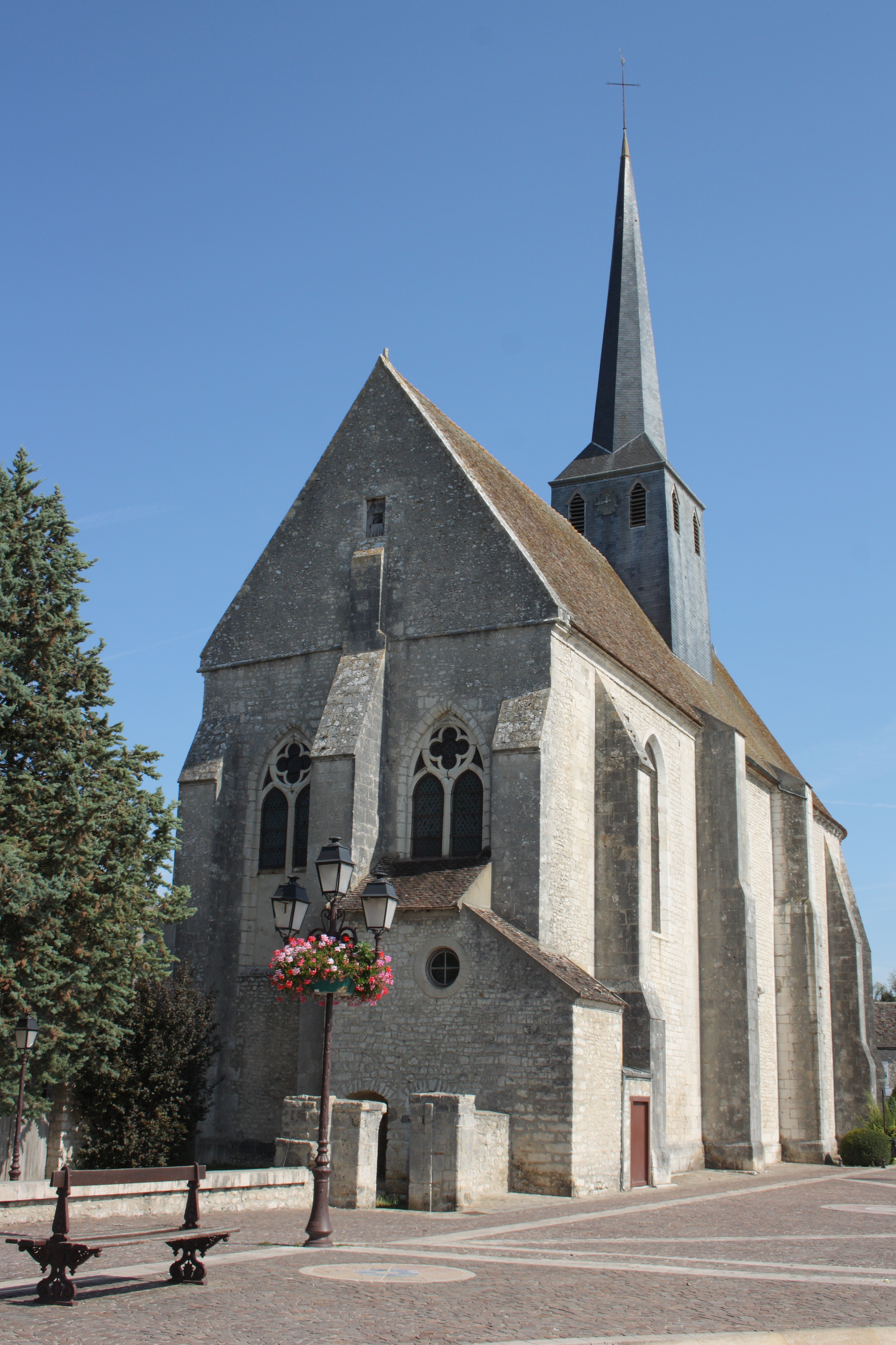
The austere Gothic church of Saint-Clair-Saint-Leger (12th century)

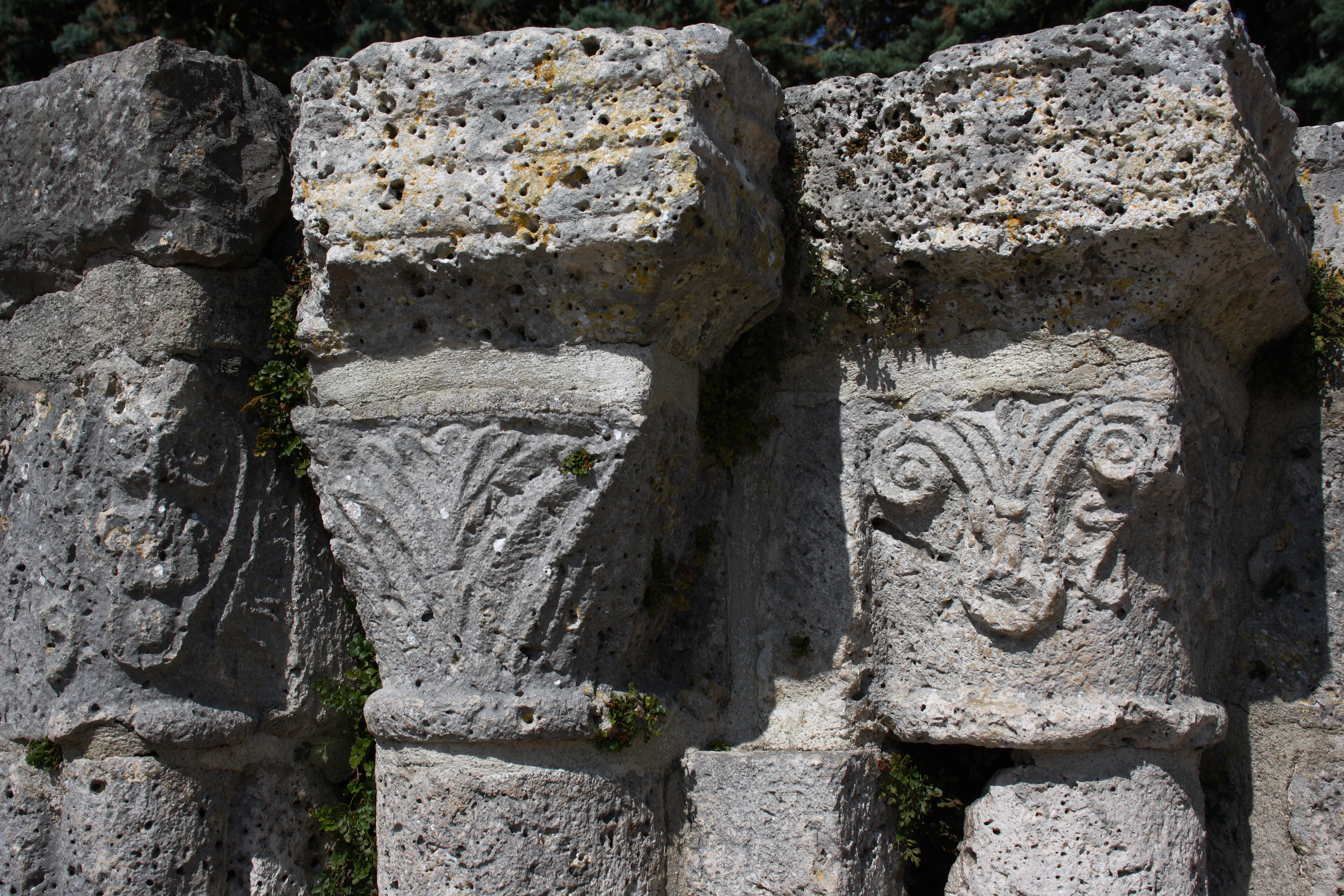
Parts of the 12th-century Gothic church of Souppes are vestiges of an earlier church, built in the 11th century.

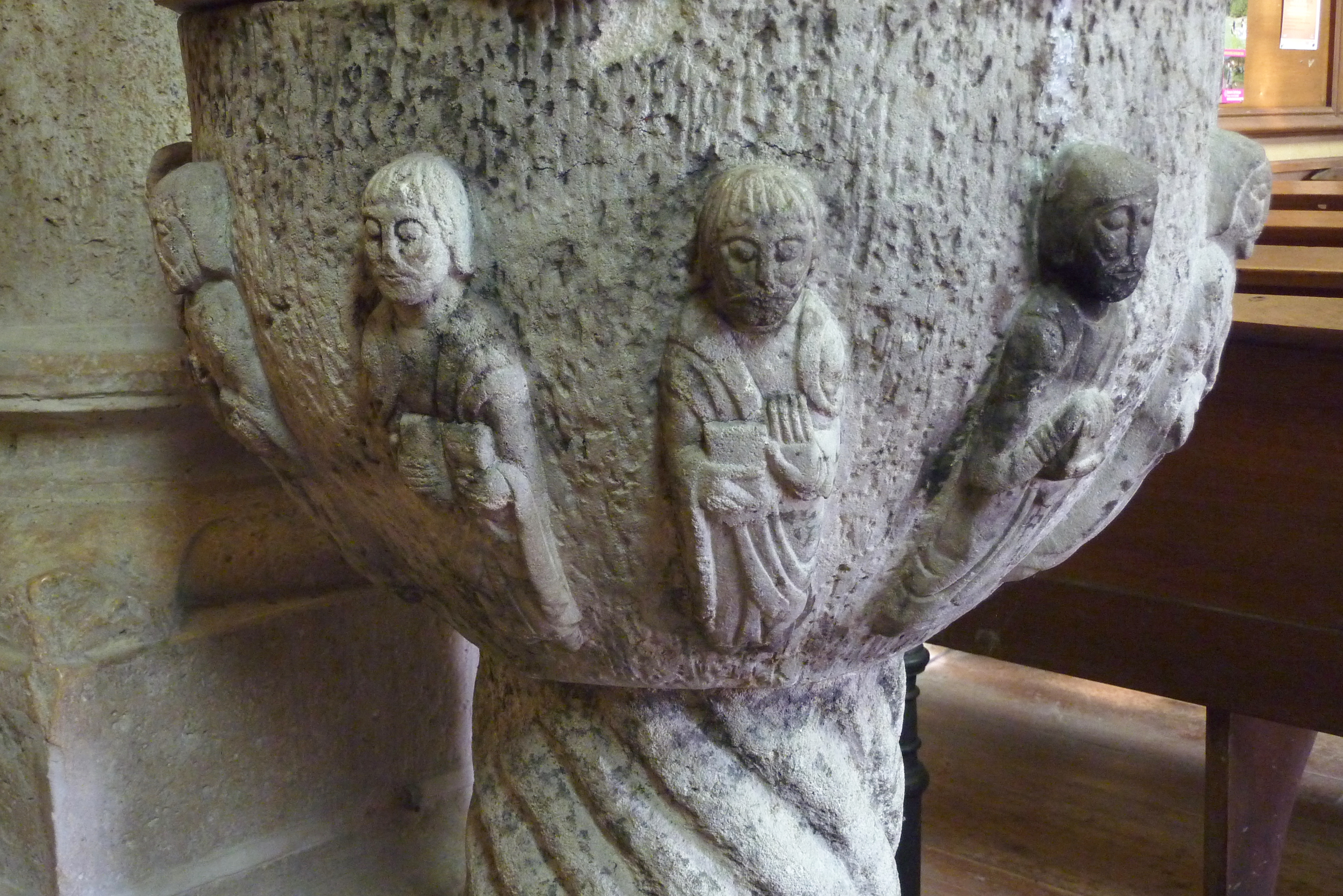
Details of the baptismal font in the church of Souppes.

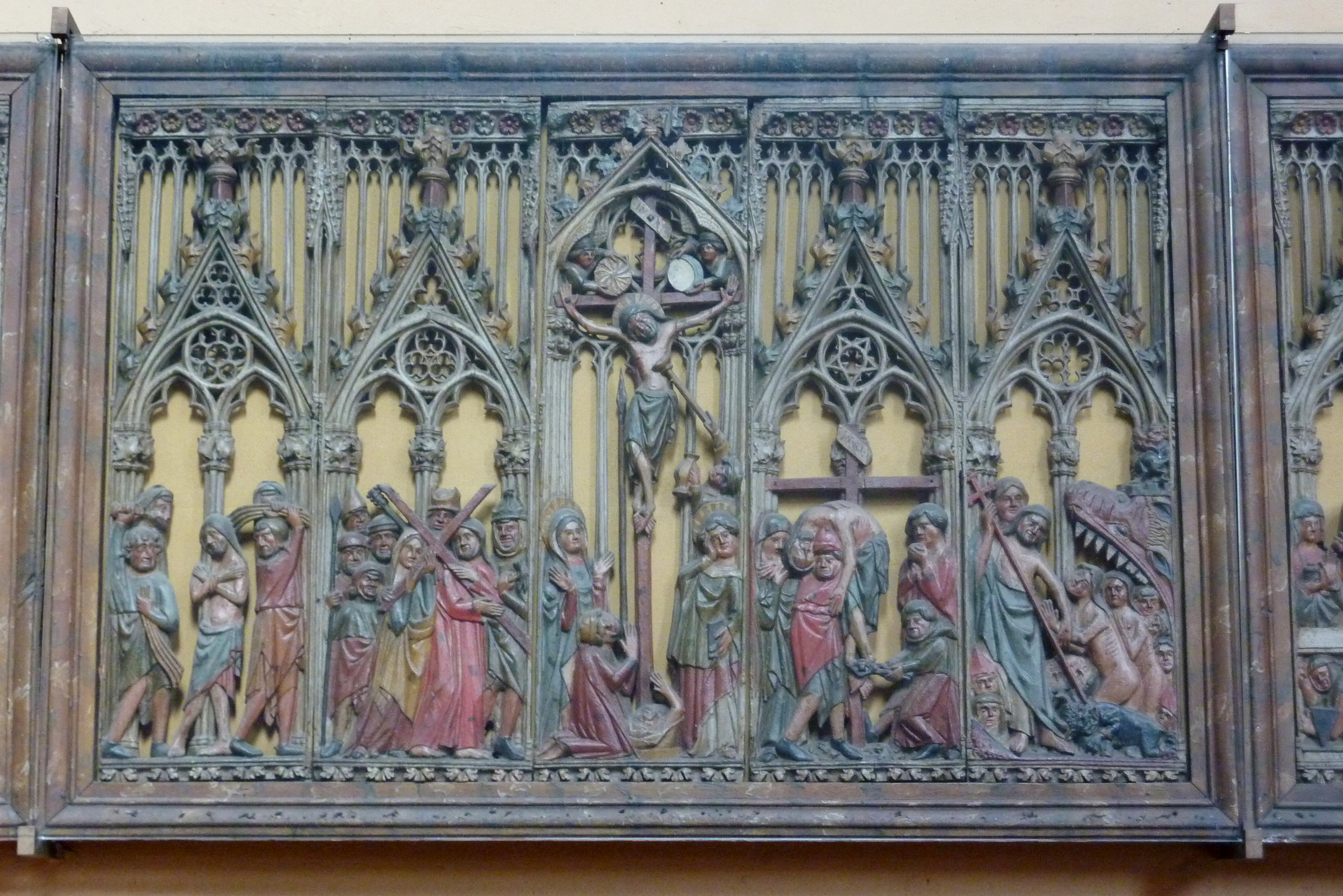
The 16th-century altar-piece in the Church of Saint-Clair-Saint-Léger, made of carved and painted wood, came from Abbey church of Saint-Marie de Cercanceauz, destroyed during the French Revolution.

=== River Commerce ===
Beginning in 1642, Souppes became a stop on the water route between Orléans and Paris. In 1604 Henry IV of France had begun a canal project to connect Orleans with the capital. Boats and barges were able to travel from Orléans to Montargis on the Loire River the Canal of Briare, but then had to be hauled, pulled by horses, up the Loing River as far as the Seine. To eliminate this difficult leg of the journey, the Loing Canal, parallel to the river, was built by the Royal Marine Regiment. It was completed in 1724 under Louis XV. The port of Souppes, on the canal, became an important shipping point for local products to Paris.

=== Souppes in the French Revolution ===
The local priest of Souppes, Anne Alexander Marie Thibault, played a small but notable role in the French Revolution. He was elected to represent the clergy of the region at the meeting of the Estates-General of 1789. He was very active in the meeting, and, although he was not actually present for the tennis court oath which began the Revolution, Jacques-Louis David included his portrait in the famous painting of the event.

The residents of the town did not suffer greatly from the Terror, but the Revolution had a dramatic effect on the town. The church was turned into a granary from 1793 to 1795. The church of Boulay was stripped of its decoration and shut, and the Abbey was closed and sold as a national property. The Abbey church was torn down, and the other buildings were turned into a paper factory.

The curé or local priest of Souppes was a delegate to the Estates-General of 1789, and was included in the famous painting of the event by Jacques-Louis David, though he was not actually present.

=== 19th and 20th century - the stone of Souppes ===
The first industry established in Souppes was a mill and workshop for making steel, built by the river in 1773. The workshop is gone, but the channel of water used for the mill can still be seen.

A refinery for making sugar out of sugar beets was opened in 1873, and, rebuilt and modernized, is still in operation.

The main industry of Souppes in the 19th century was the quarrying of creamy white building stones for the buildings and monuments of Paris. The layer of white stone crosses the Souppes Valley from east to west, and the local stone had been used for centuries; the presence of a quarry at l'Endurcy is recorded in 1750. With the completion of the canal linking Souppes with the Seine and with Paris, providing building stone for Paris buildings and monuments became a major activity of the town. The Arc de Triomphe was built of stone from the quarry at Chateau-Landon, south of Souppes. The stone for the statue of Saint Genevieve and the Pont de la Tournelle (1928) on which it stands both came from the quarry of Souppes. All of the quarries of the valley were engaged in providing stone for the Basilica of Sacré Coeur on Montmartre at the end of the 19th and beginning of the 20th century. The quarries were a major industry until the 1950s. Two quarries are still active.

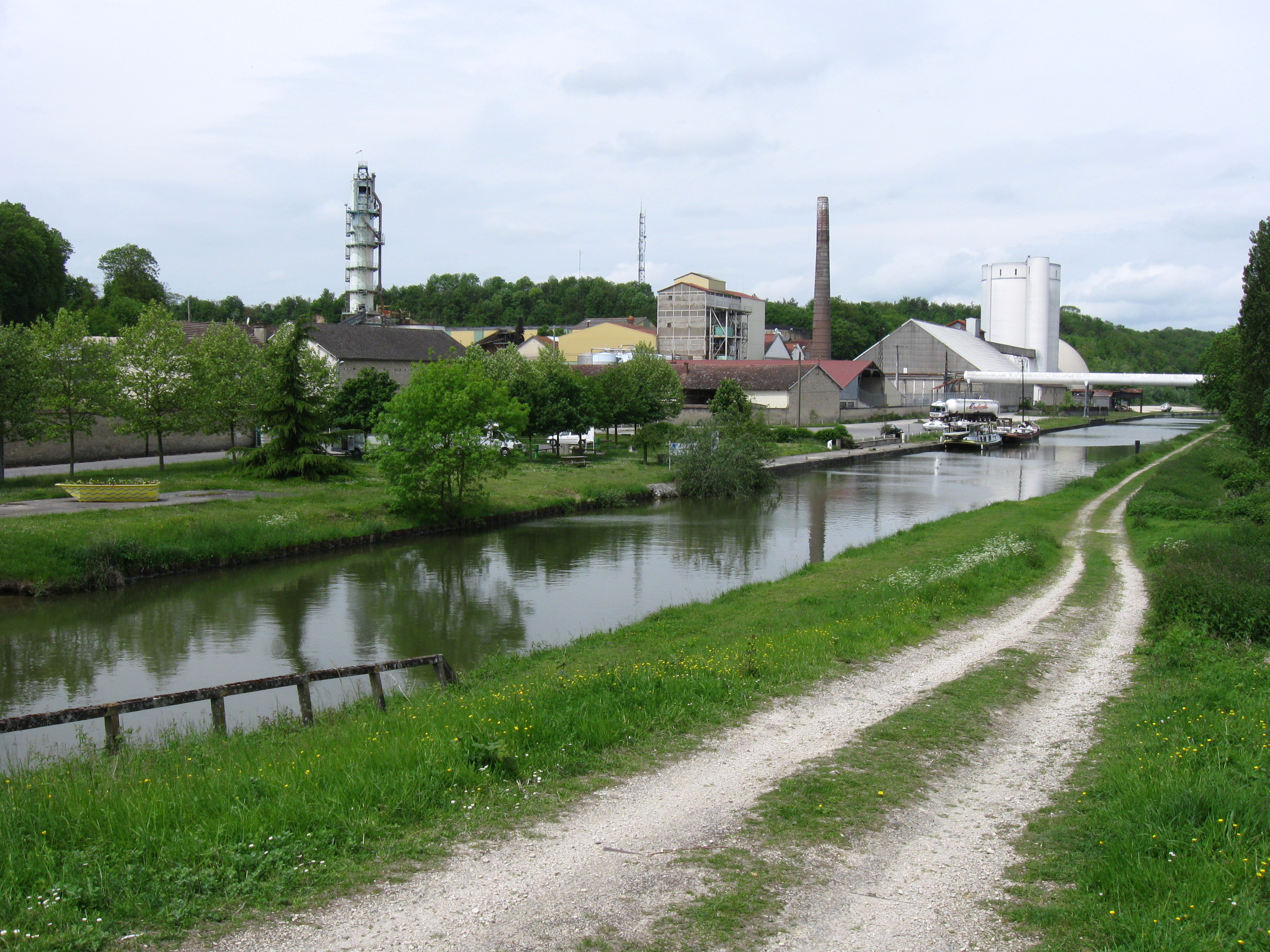
The sugar mill, next to the Loing canal, was founded in 1873 and is the largest business enterprise in Souppes.

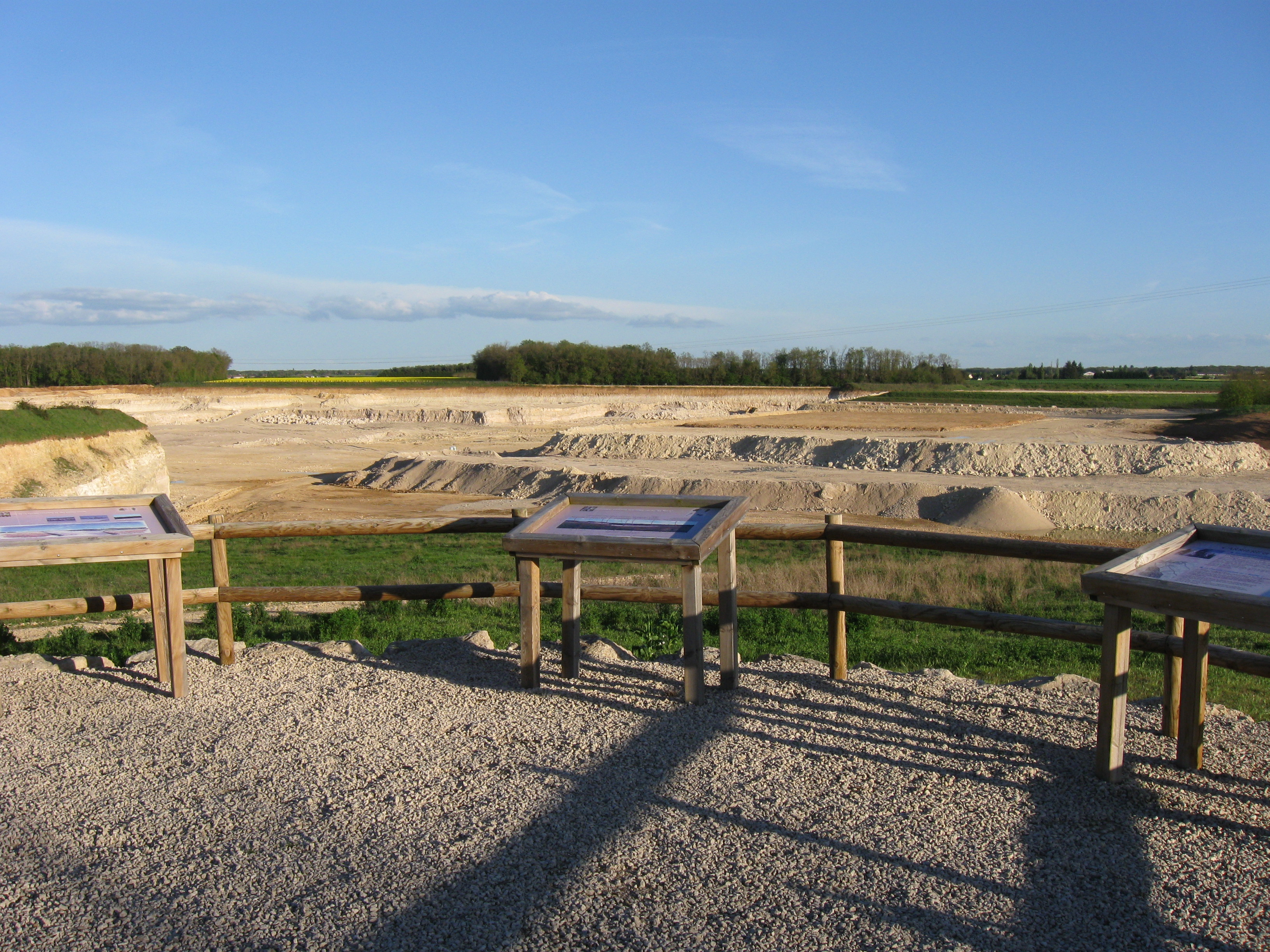
The stone quarries of Souppes-sur-Loing provided the white stone for many Paris landmarks in the 19th and 20th century.

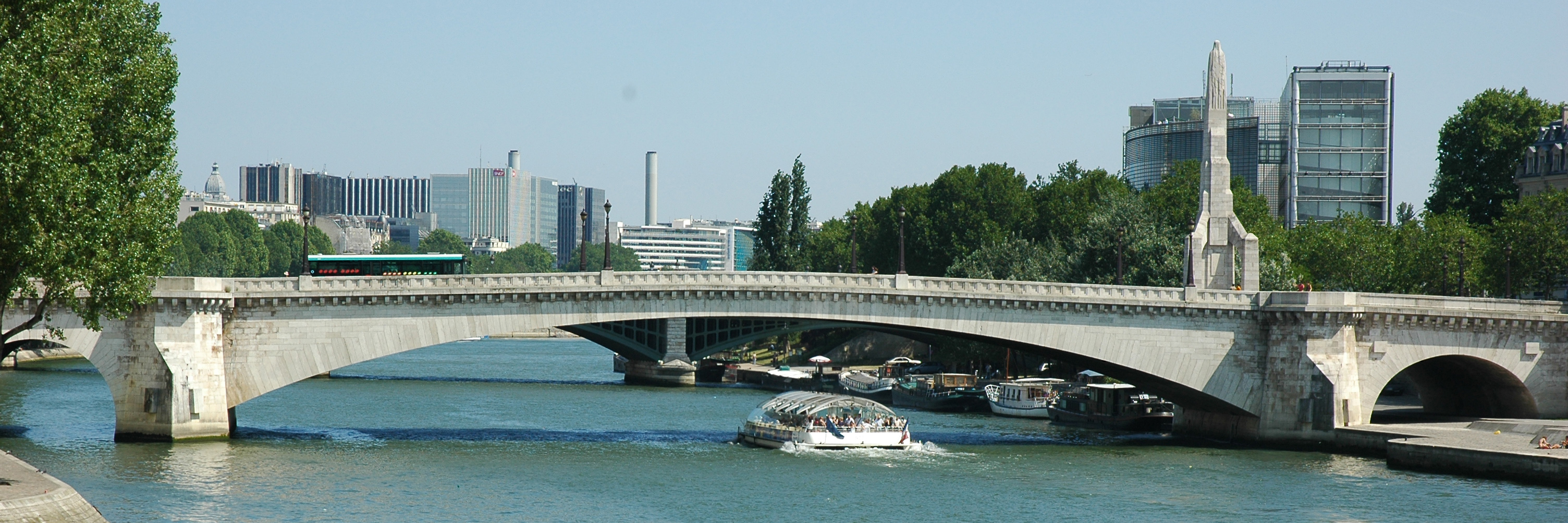
The Pont de la Tournelle (1928) in Paris is built of the white stone of Souppes.

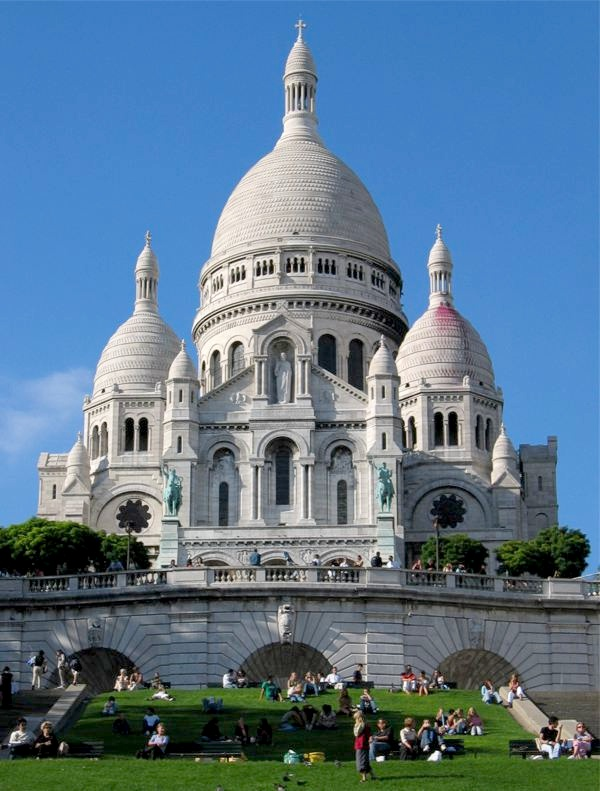
The Basilica of Sacre-Coeur in Paris was also built with the stone of Souppes.

=== Souppes in the Second World War ===
Souppes played a small but important part in the liberation of France during the Second World War. In August 1944 the U.S. Third Army, led By General George Patton, had circled around the German lines in Normandy and was racing toward the gap between Paris and Orleans. Orleans was liberated on 16 August, the lower Seine was crossed at Mantes on the 19th, and on 19 August General Eisenhower gave orders for the Third Army to reach the upper Seine River south of Paris. On the same day, an uprising by the French resistance began in Paris.

The objective of the 4th Armored Division was to cross the Loing River at Montargis, fifteen miles south of Souppes. and get as far as town of Sens, on the Yonne River. However, Hitler had given orders to strongly defend the town of Montargis. When the 4th Division reached Montargis, they found the Germans were there in force and that the bridges over the Loing had been destroyed. A U.S. reconnaissance team discovered that the bridge over the Loing at Souppes had been damaged but was still usable. The 4th Division and the 137th Infantry regiment of the 35th Division crossed the bridge on 21 August and sped to Sens, where they took the Germans completely by surprise. German officers in parade uniform were strolling in the park. By the 24th the Third Army had reached the upper Seine and established four bridgeheads on the other side. On 25 June U.S. and Free French forces entered the center of Paris, and the German forces in the city surrendered.

=== Floods ===
The widespread flooding of Ile-de-France in June 2016 was devastating for Souppes. The town center was inundated with water, waist-deep in places, forcing roughly 800 residents to flee and forcing closure of many businesses. Almost a year later, in May 2017, many shops remained closed. A group of flood victims instigated a claim for damages against the organization that operates the canal system in France, the VNF, accusing it of mismanagement of the Canals du Loing and de Briare, and failure to protect Souppes and other towns along the Loing.

== Population ==
Inhabitants of Souppes-sur-Loing are called Sulpicien(ne)s in French.

Historical population
Year	Pop.	±% p.a.
1968	4,437	—
1975	4,351	−0.28%
1982	4,326	−0.08%
1990	4,851	+1.44%
1999	5,348	+1.09%
2007	5,605	+0.59%
2012	5,496	−0.39%
2017	5,390	−0.39%
2023	4,952	−1.40%
Source: INSEE

== Gallery ==
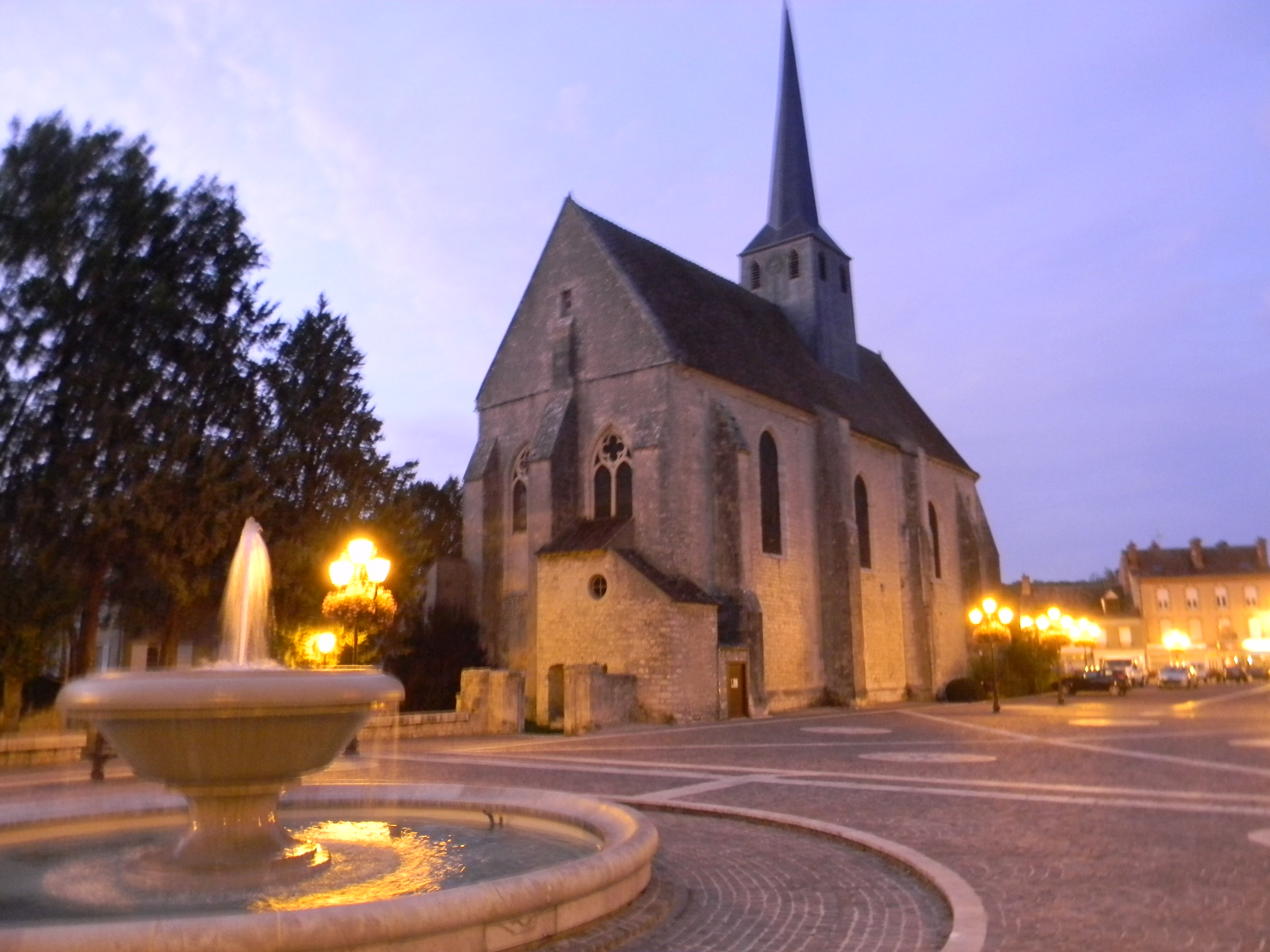
The Church of Saint-Clair-Saint-Leger in Souppes-sur-Loing, originally part of a Cistercian monastery (12th century).

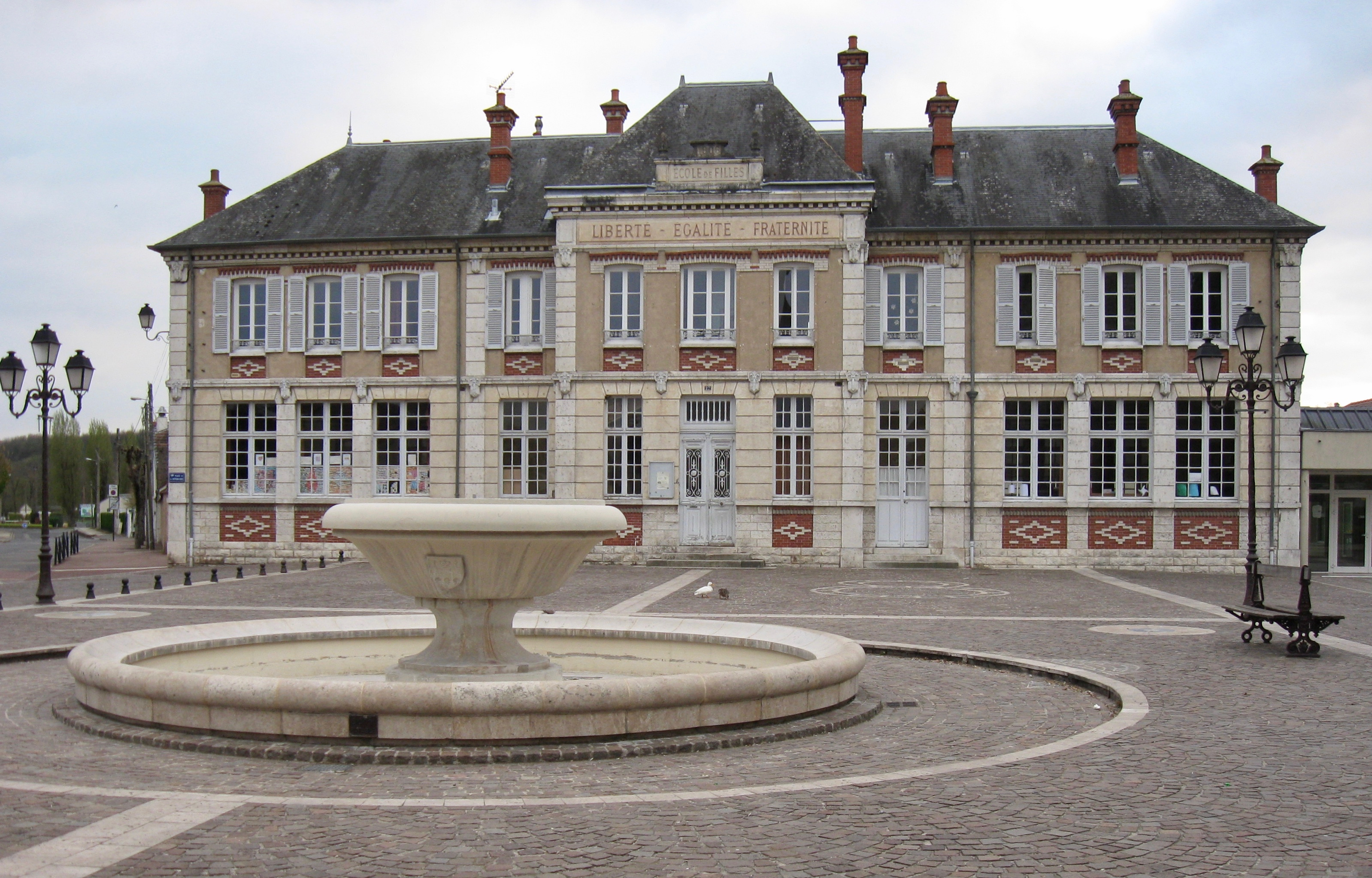
The public school of Souppes (1906), located on the town square across from the church.

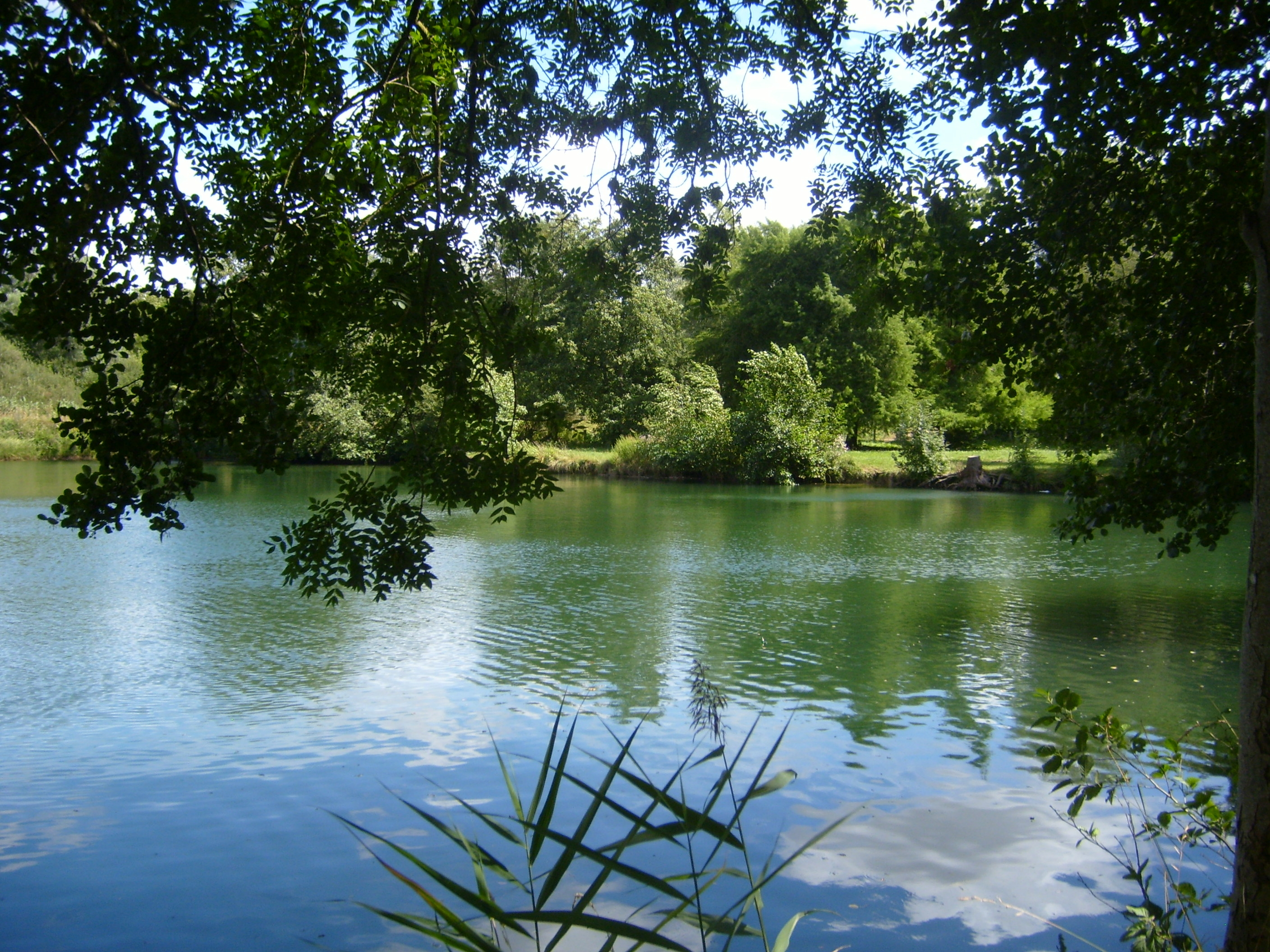
The River Loing at Souppes-sur-Loing

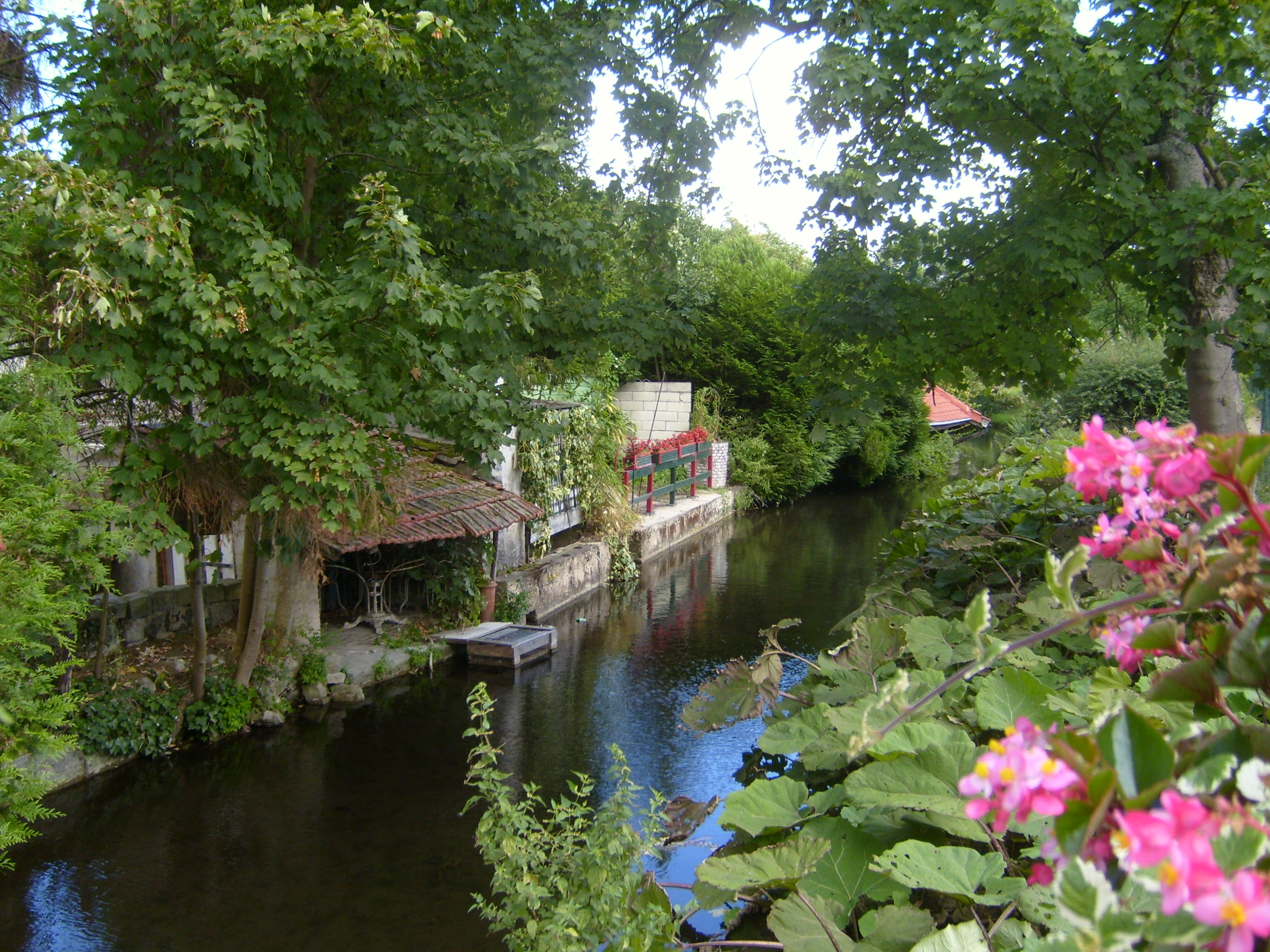
A channel of the Loing River passes through the town of Souppes near the church.

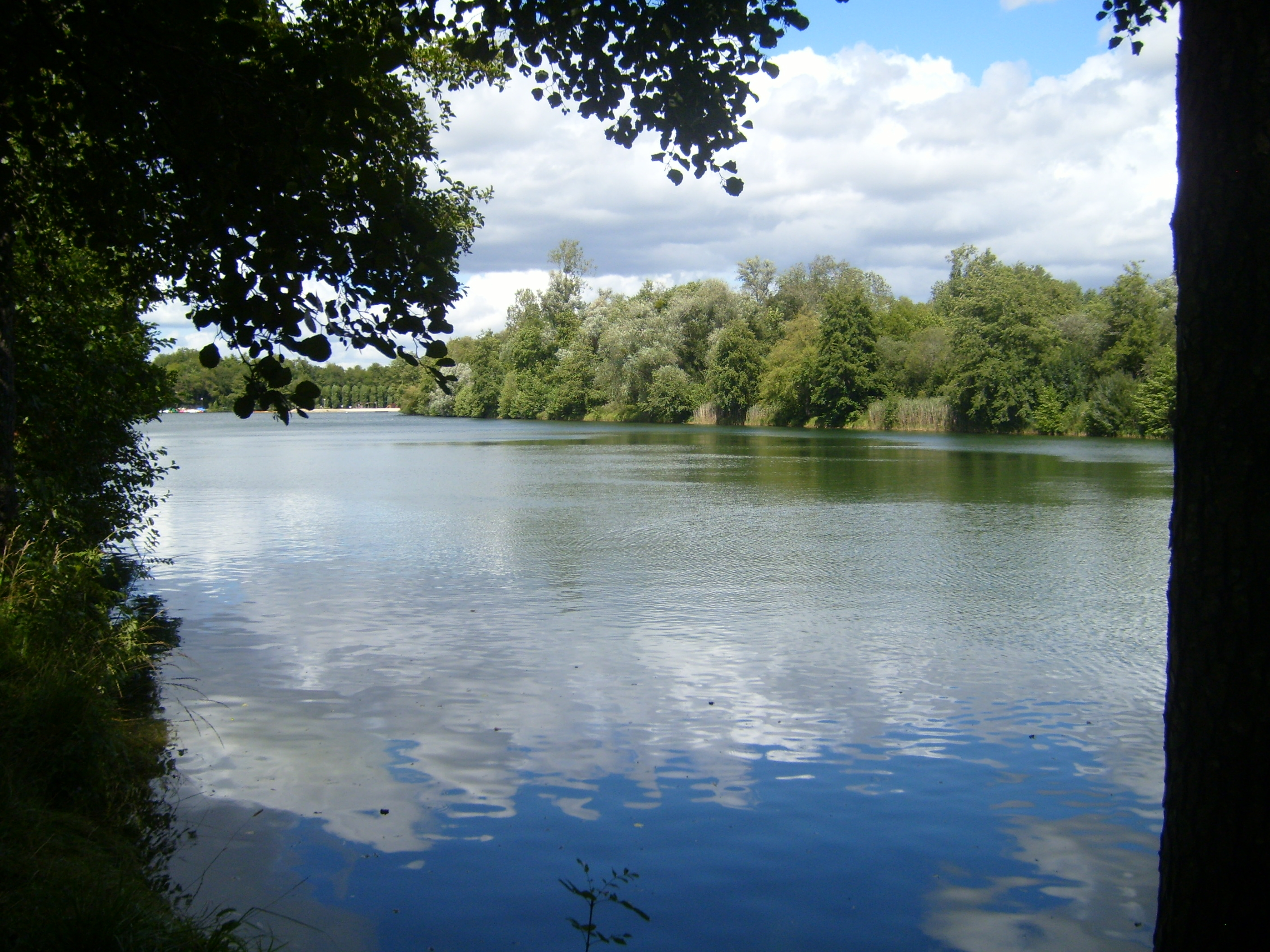
The lake in the public park of Souppes-sur-Loing

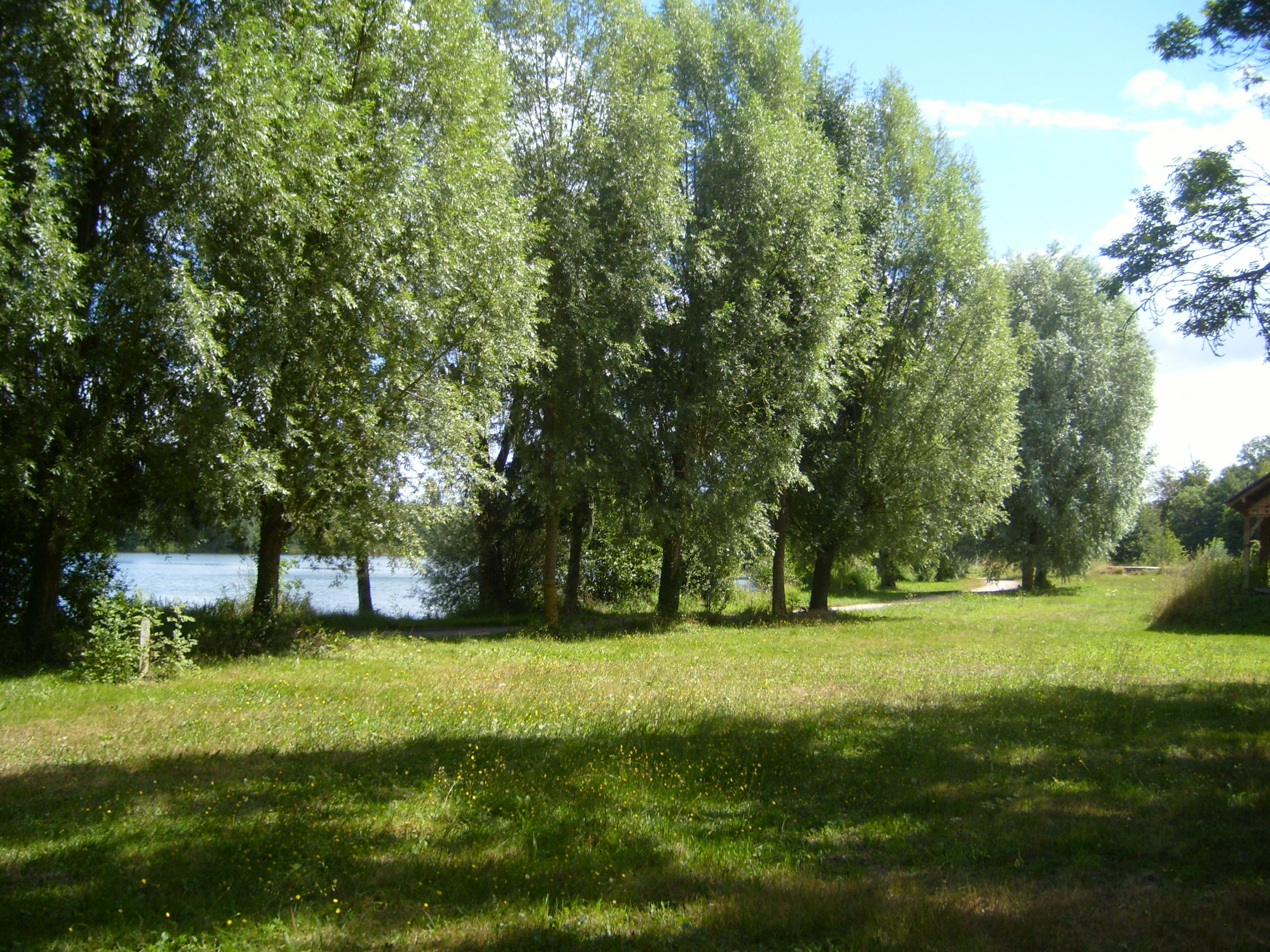
The public park beside the Loing River in Souppes-sur-Loing

== See also ==
- Communes of the Seine-et-Marne department
