= Ferrières–Fontenay station =

Railway station in Fontenay-sur-Loing, France

Ferrières–Fontenay
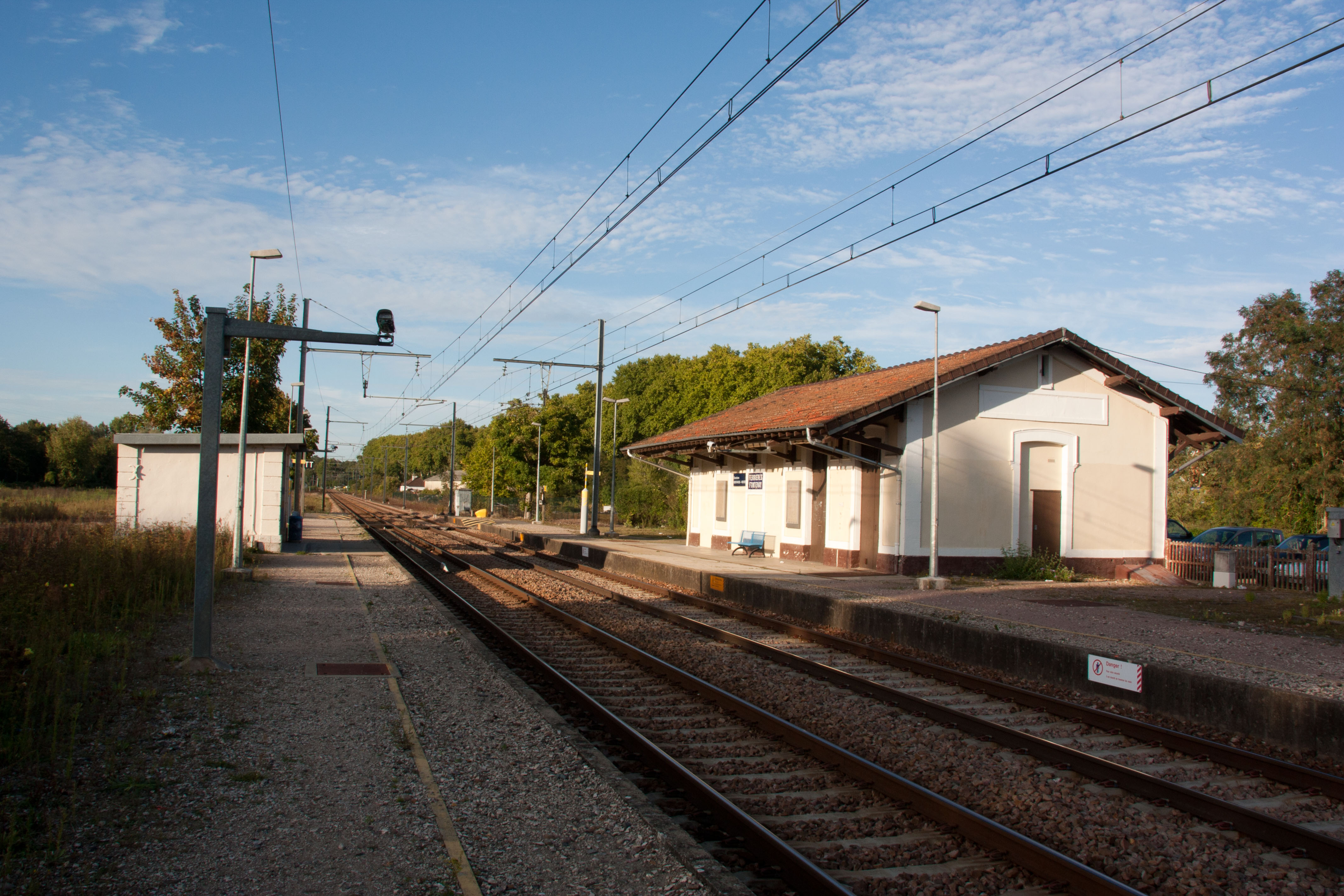

General information
- Location: Fontenay-sur-Loing, Loiret, Centre-Val de Loire; France
- Coordinates: 48°05′47″N 2°46′22″E
- Line: Moret-Lyon railway
- Platforms: 2
- Tracks: 2

Other information
- Station code: 87684241

Services
Preceding station	Transilien	Following station
Dordives towards Paris-Lyon	Line R	Montargis Terminus
Location

Ferrières–Fontenay is a railway station in Fontenay-sur-Loing, Centre-Val de Loire, France. The station is located on the Moret–Lyon railway. The station is served by Transilien line R (Paris-Gare de Lyon) operated by SNCF.

== See also ==
- Transilien Paris–Lyon
