= Fontenay-sur-Loing =

- Commune
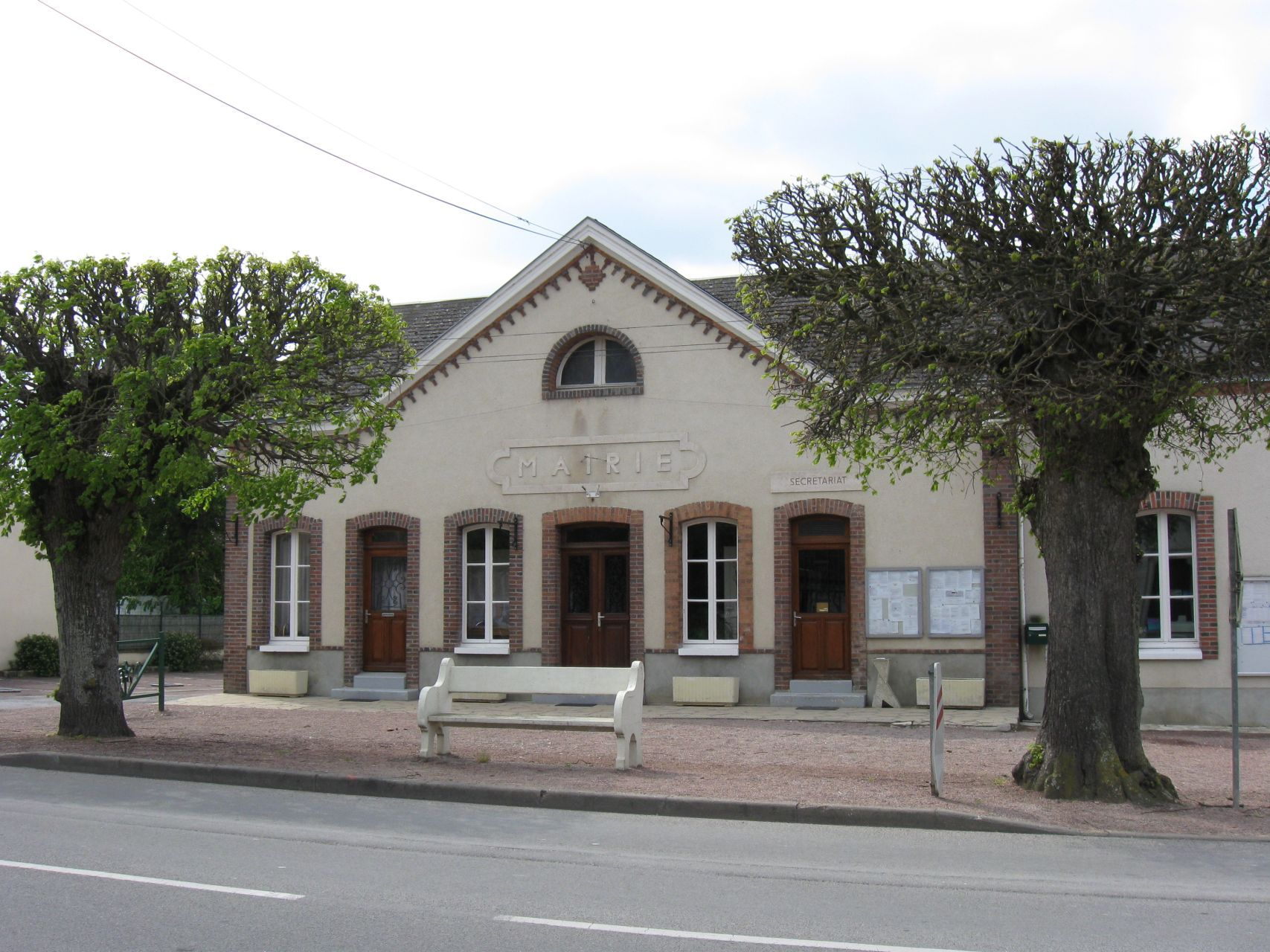
- The town hall in Fontenay-sur-Loing
- Location of Fontenay-sur-Loing
- Location within France Location within Centre-Val de Loire
- Coordinates: 48°06′18″N 2°46′30″E
- Country: France
- Region: Centre-Val de Loire
- Department: Loiret
- Arrondissement: Montargis
- Canton: Courtenay
- Intercommunality: Quatre Vallées

Government
  - Mayor (2020–2026): Evelyne Lefeuvre
- Area^{1}: 9.73 km^{2} (3.76 sq mi)
- Highest elevation: 109 m (358 ft)
- Lowest elevation: 70 m (230 ft)
- Population (2023): 1,659
  - Density: 171/km^{2} (442/sq mi)
- Demonym: Fontenaysiens
- Time zone: UTC+01:00 (CET)
  - Summer (DST): UTC+02:00 (CEST)
- INSEE/Postal code: 45148 /45210
- Website: www.mairie-fontenaysurloing.fr
- ^{1} French Land Register data, which excludes lakes, ponds, glaciers > 1 km^{2} (0.386 sq mi or 247 acres) and river estuaries.

Fontenay-sur-Loing (French pronunciation: [fɔ̃tnɛ syʁ lwɛ̃], literally Fontenay on Loing) is a commune in the Loiret department in north-central France. Ferrières–Fontenay station has rail connections to Montargis, Melun and Paris.

== See also ==
- Communes of the Loiret department
