= Nemours – Saint-Pierre station =

Railway station in France

Nemours Saint-Pierre
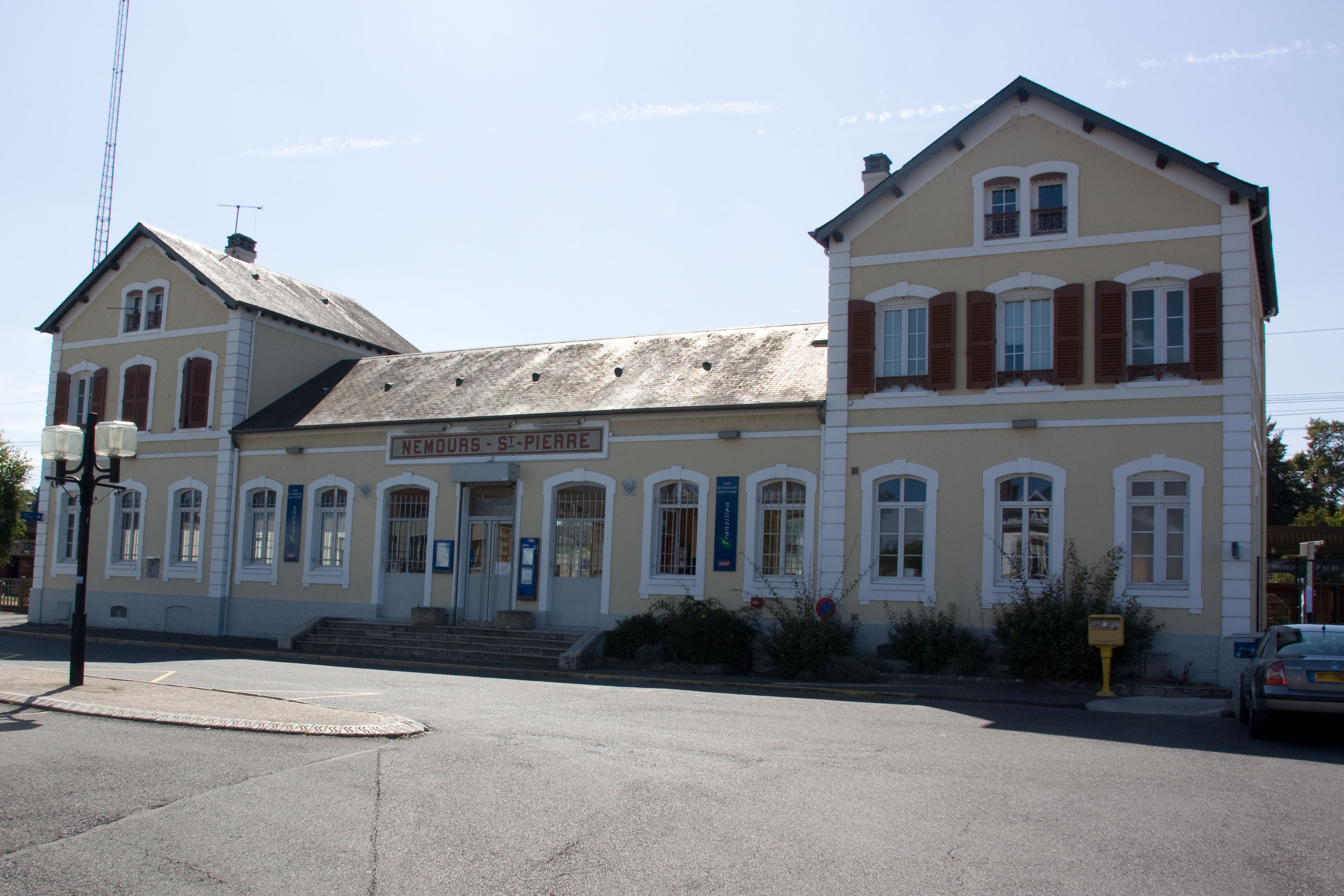
- Gare de Nemours–Saint-Pierre

General information
- Location: Nemours, Seine-et-Marne, Île-de-France; France
- Coordinates: 48°16′03″N 2°41′08″E
- Line: Moret-Lyon railway
- Platforms: 2
- Tracks: 2

Other information
- Station code: 87684126
- Fare zone: 5

History
- Opened: 1862

Passengers
- 2024: 1,525,880

Services
Preceding station	SNCF	Following station
Paris-Bercy Terminus	Intercités	Montargis towards Nevers
Preceding station	Transilien	Following station
Bourron-Marlotte–Grez towards Paris-Lyon	Line R	Bagneaux-sur-Loing towards Montargis
Location

Nemours–Saint-Pierre is a railway station in Nemours and Saint-Pierre-lès-Nemours, Île-de-France, France. The station opened in 1862 and is located on the Moret–Lyon railway. The station is served by Intercités (long-distance trains) and by Transilien line R (Paris-Gare de Lyon) operated by SNCF. The station building was destroyed in 1870 after a Prussian attack, but the building was not rebuilt until 1881.

== Train services ==
The station is served by Intercités (long distance) services operated by SNCF between Paris and Nevers, and by Transilien line R (from Paris-Gare de Lyon).

== Gallery ==
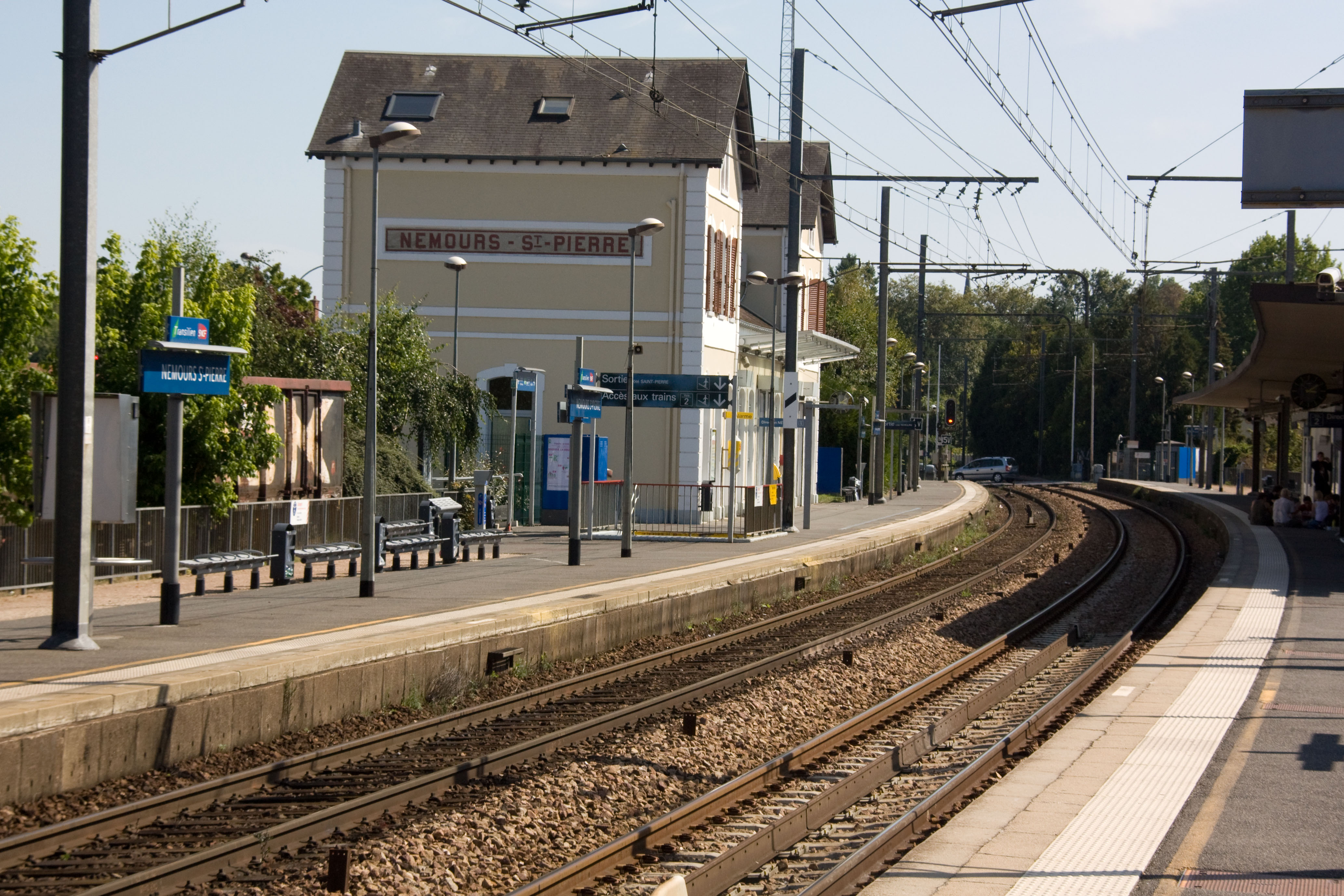
The station

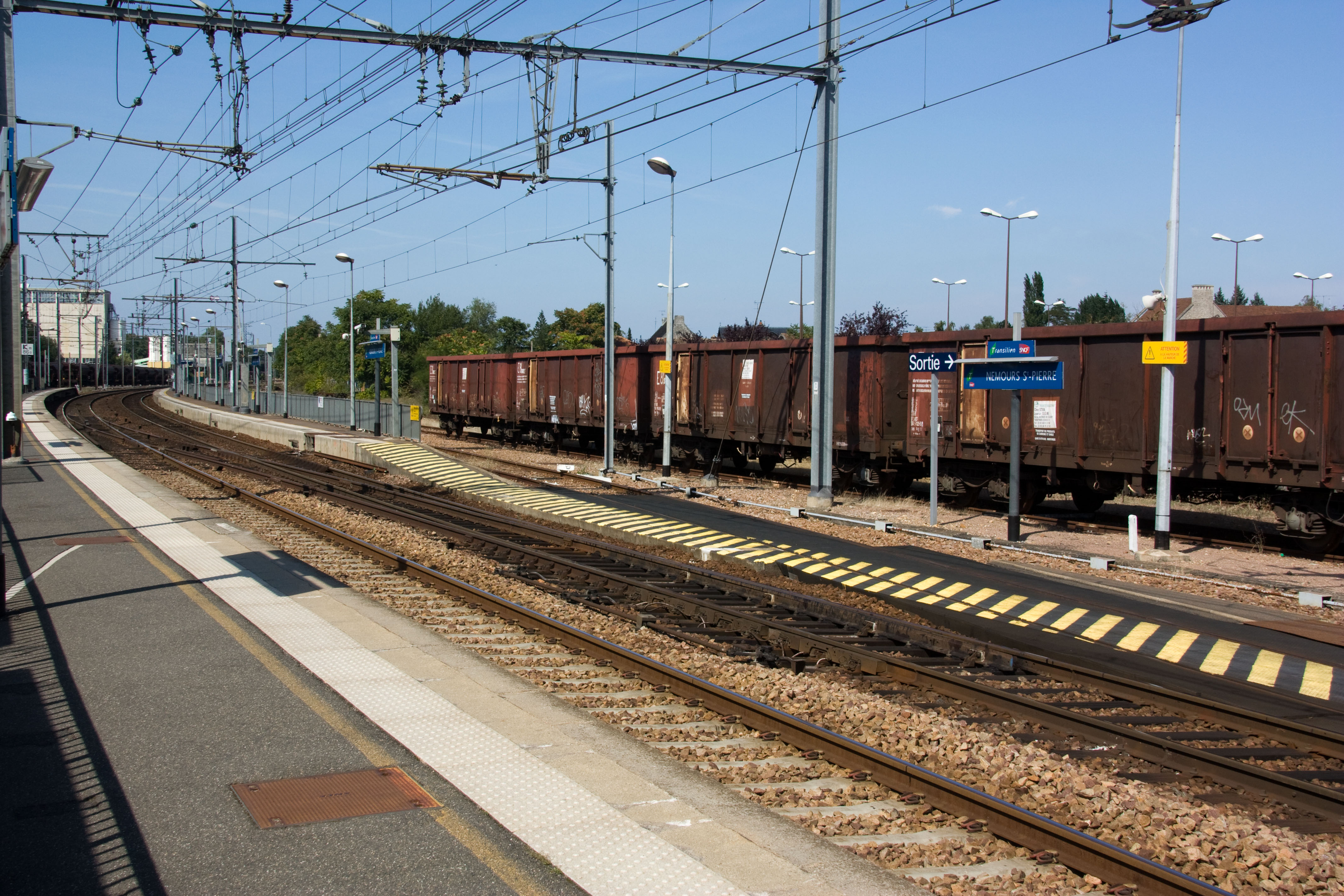
The station and freight siding

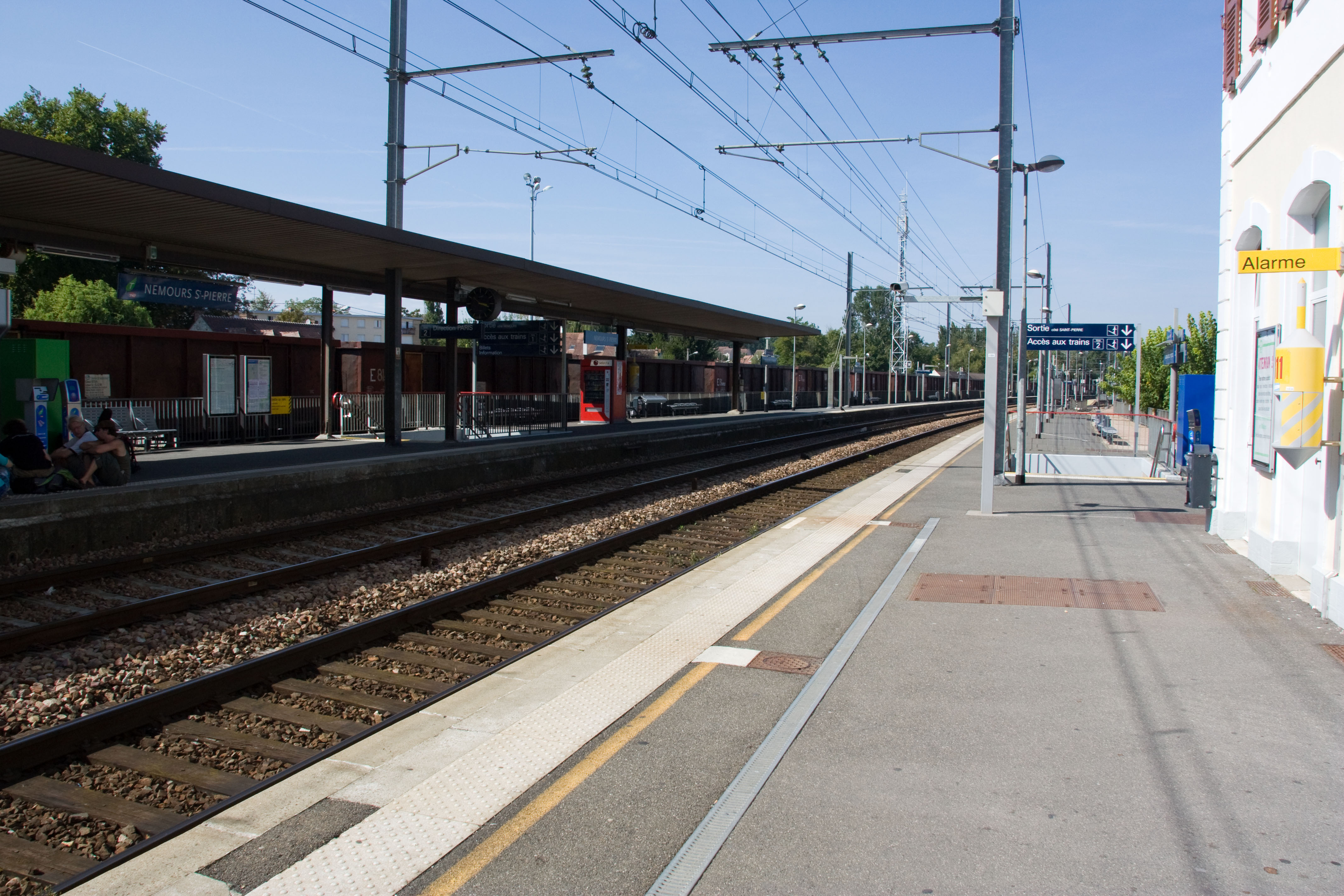
The station

== See also ==
- Transilien Paris–Lyon
