= Dordives =

- Commune
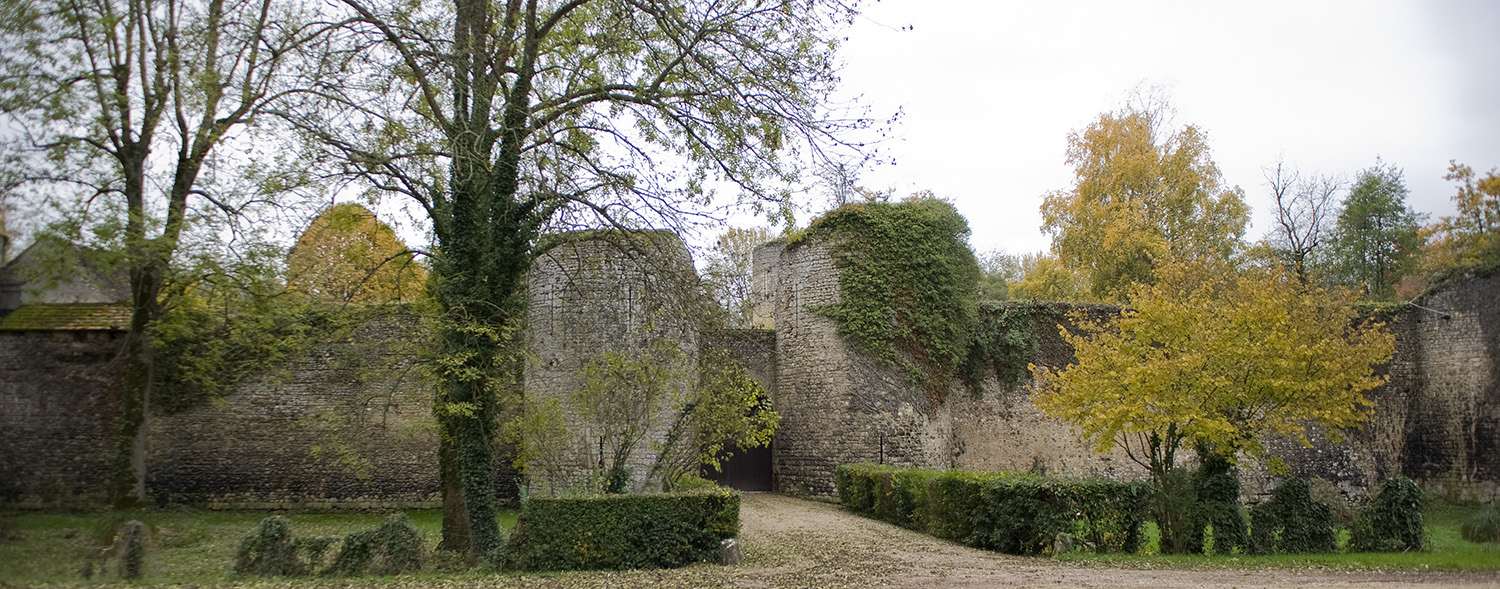
- The Château of Mez-le-Maréchal, in Dordives

- Coat of arms
- Location of Dordives
- Location within France Location within Centre-Val de Loire
- Coordinates: 48°08′39″N 2°46′05″E
- Country: France
- Region: Centre-Val de Loire
- Department: Loiret
- Arrondissement: Montargis
- Canton: Courtenay
- Intercommunality: Quatre Vallées

Government
  - Mayor (2020–2026): Jean Berthaud
- Area^{1}: 15.18 km^{2} (5.86 sq mi)
- Highest elevation: 115 m (377 ft)
- Lowest elevation: 67 m (220 ft)
- Population (2023): 3,277
  - Density: 215.9/km^{2} (559.1/sq mi)
- Demonym: Dordivois
- Time zone: UTC+01:00 (CET)
  - Summer (DST): UTC+02:00 (CEST)
- INSEE/Postal code: 45127 /45680
- Website: www.dordives.com
- ^{1} French Land Register data, which excludes lakes, ponds, glaciers > 1 km^{2} (0.386 sq mi or 247 acres) and river estuaries.

Dordives (French pronunciation: [dɔʁdiv]) is a commune in the Loiret department in north-central France. Dordives station has rail connections to Montargis, Melun and Paris.

== Population ==
Historical population
Year	Pop.	±% p.a.
1968	1,015	—
1975	1,381	+4.50%
1982	1,941	+4.98%
1990	2,388	+2.62%
1999	2,593	+0.92%
2007	2,829	+1.09%
2012	3,143	+2.13%
2017	3,313	+1.06%
2023	3,277	−0.18%
Source: INSEE

== See also ==
- Communes of the Loiret department
