= Montargis station =

Railway station in Montargis, France

Montargis Station
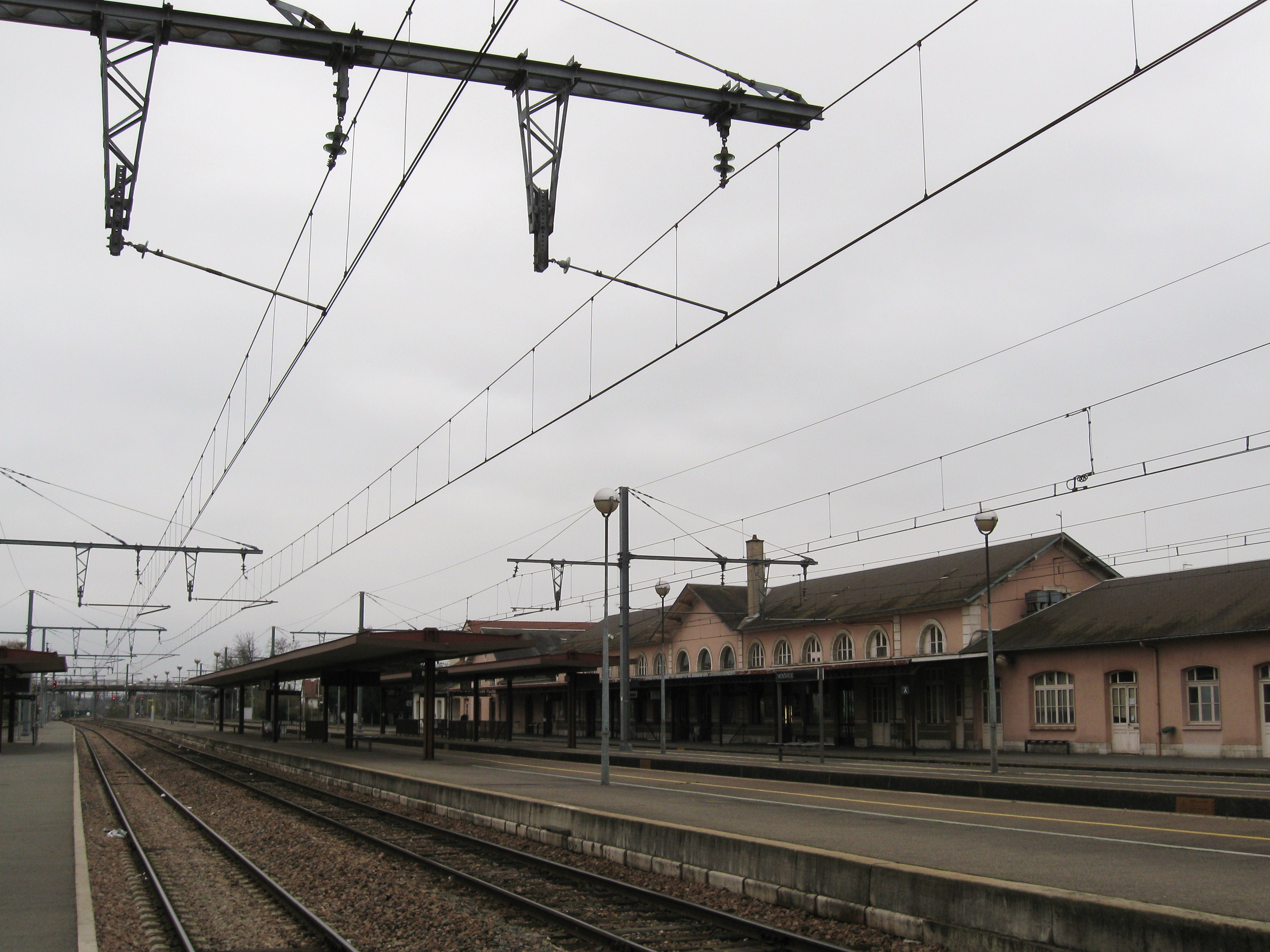

General information
- Location: Montargis, Loiret, Centre-Val de Loire; France
- Coordinates: 48°0′25″N 2°44′35″E
- Line: Moret-Lyon railway
- Platforms: 2
- Tracks: 2

Other information
- Station code: 87684001

Passengers
- 2024: 1,948,917

Services
Preceding station	SNCF	Following station
Nemours – Saint-Pierre towards Paris-Bercy	Intercités	Nogent-sur-Vernisson towards Nevers

Other services
Preceding station	Transilien	Following station
Ferrières-Fontenay towards Paris-Lyon	Line R	Terminus
Location

The Montargis Station (French: gare de Montargis) is a railway station in Montargis, Centre-Val de Loire, France. The station is located on the Moret-Lyon railway. The station is served by Intercités (long distance) services operated by SNCF between Paris–Bercy and Nevers, and by Transilien line R (from Paris-Gare de Lyon).
