= Léon Trulin =

Belgian private detective

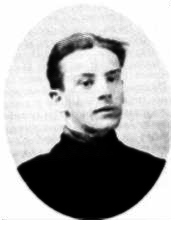
- Léon Trulin
- Born: 2 June 1897; Ath, Belgium
- Died: 8 November 1915 (aged 18); Lille, Belgium
- Cause of death: Execution by firing squad
- Citizenship: Belgium

Léon Trulin (2 June 1897 – 8 November 1915) was a Belgian spy executed by the German military authorities because of his spying activities during First World War.

== Life ==
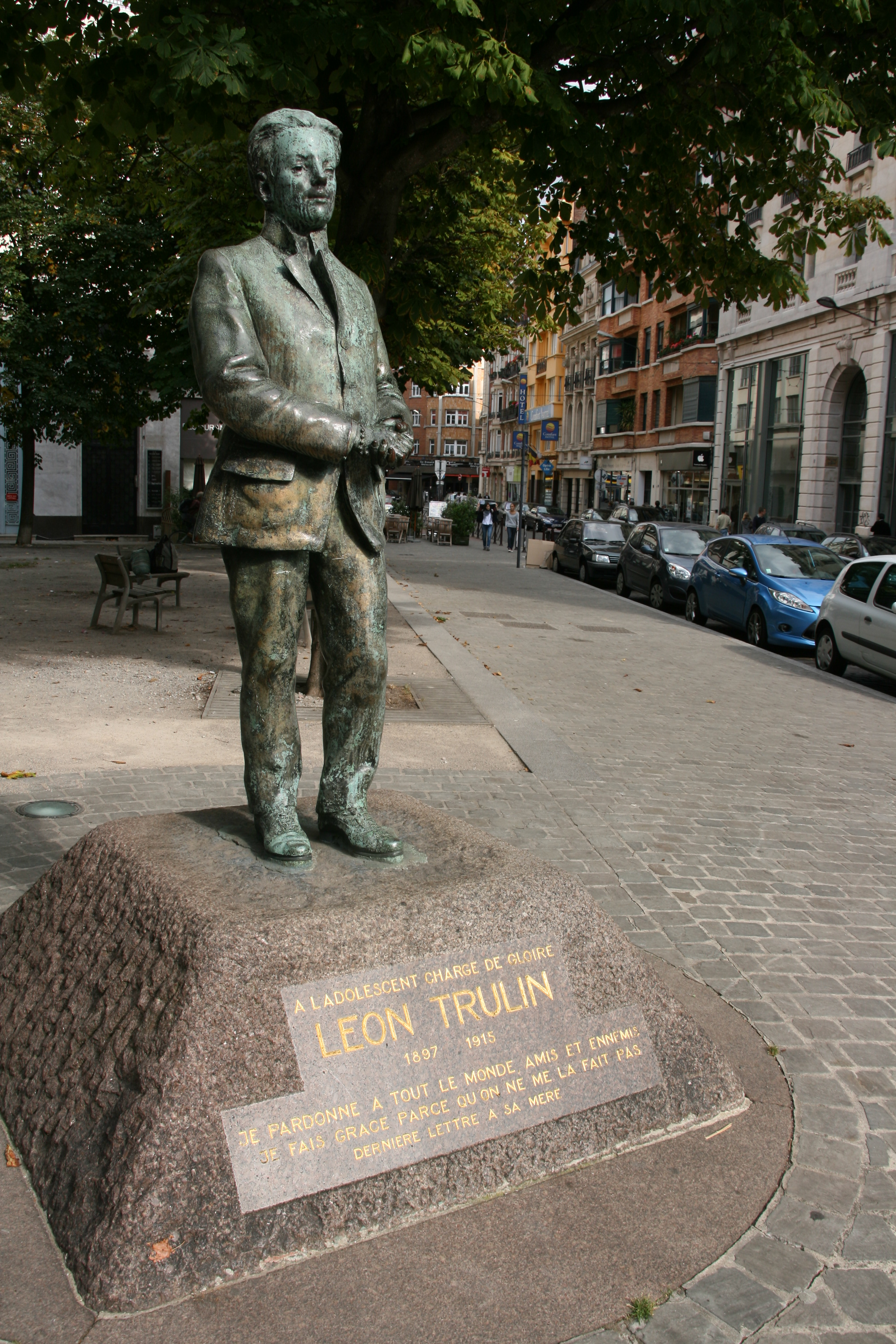
Léon Trulin, by Edgar-Henri Boutry indicating the birth date in 1897

Léon Trulin was born in Ath, in Belgium 2 June 1897. He was the second to last in a family of eight children. His father was a plumber and his mother was a worker in the fur industry. After the death of his father, at the age of 43, the family left the hometown and moved to La Madeleine, then Lille. Raised catholic, Léon studied in non-religious schools (Victor Hugo in La Madeleine and Monge in Lille)

In June 1910, to help his family overcome its poverty, he was hired as an apprentice in a fur factory. He was hurt in a work accident. During his long recovery (8 months), he read intensively and acquired a cultural literacy that was rare for a worker of his time. When healed, he found a job in a metal factory. At night, he studied touch typing and subscribed to the school of Beaux-Arts where he became an employee.

In the summer of 1914, World War I began. In June 1915, Léon Trulin went to England to join the Belgian army but was rejected because of his sickly-looking aspect. He then accepted spying missions on which he went to the North of France several times. With his friend Raymond Derain he created the network "Noël Lurtin" (anagram of his own name) or Léon 143. They collected precious information from Ath to Brussels, from Antwerp to the Dutch border.

In the night from the 3 to 4 October 1915, Raymond and Léon, coming from Antwerp, headed toward Putte, Kapellen on the Belgium-Dutch border. Crossing the Wire of Death, they were arrested by a German patrol. They were brought to the Béguines jail in Antwerp. Léon was in cell number 176, from the 4 to 12 October 1915. On the 12th, at night they were transferred to the Citadel of Lille where he joined his companions in resistance.

In November 1915, after a short hearing, in the room of the German military court that was set up in the offices of the newspaper La Dépêche, in the Nationale street, the verdict was given: Léon Trulin, Marcel Gotti and Raymond Derain were sentenced to death and lose forever their civil rights. Lucien Dewalf, Marcel Lemaire and André Hermann received fifteen years of jail and five years of loss of their civil right. Marcel Denèque was set free. The verdict was submitted two days later to the commander in chief of the city, General von Heinrich, that ratified the death sentence for Trulin (18 years old) without any chance of pardon, commuted the death sentence of Derain (18 years old) and Marcel Gotti (15-year-old) to life of hard labor, keeping the fifteen years for Lucien Deswaf (18 years old), Marcel Lemaire (17 years old) and André Hermann (17 years old), but removing the loss of their civil rights.

When informed about the verdict, Léon Trulin simply said "I did it for my country". Then he wrote in his notebook "On 7 November 1915, at 4:10 am, French time, received death sentence around 3:1/4 am" And below : "I die for my country and without regrets. Simply I am very sad for my dear mother and my brothers and sisters who will suffer from this fate without being guilty"

On 8 November, in the ditches of the Citadel, the young Trulin, who the president of the Bar from Lille Philippe Kah called The teenager full of glory in the book that he wrote about him, was executed.

== Memories ==
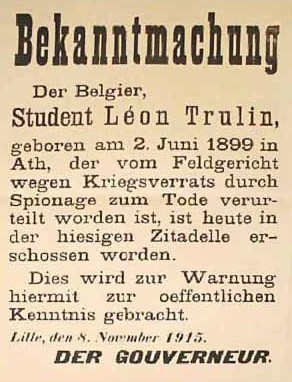
Execution report of Léon Trulin. The date of birth, containing errors, is likely to be based on the fake date of birth Trulin was using on his own ID to look younger.

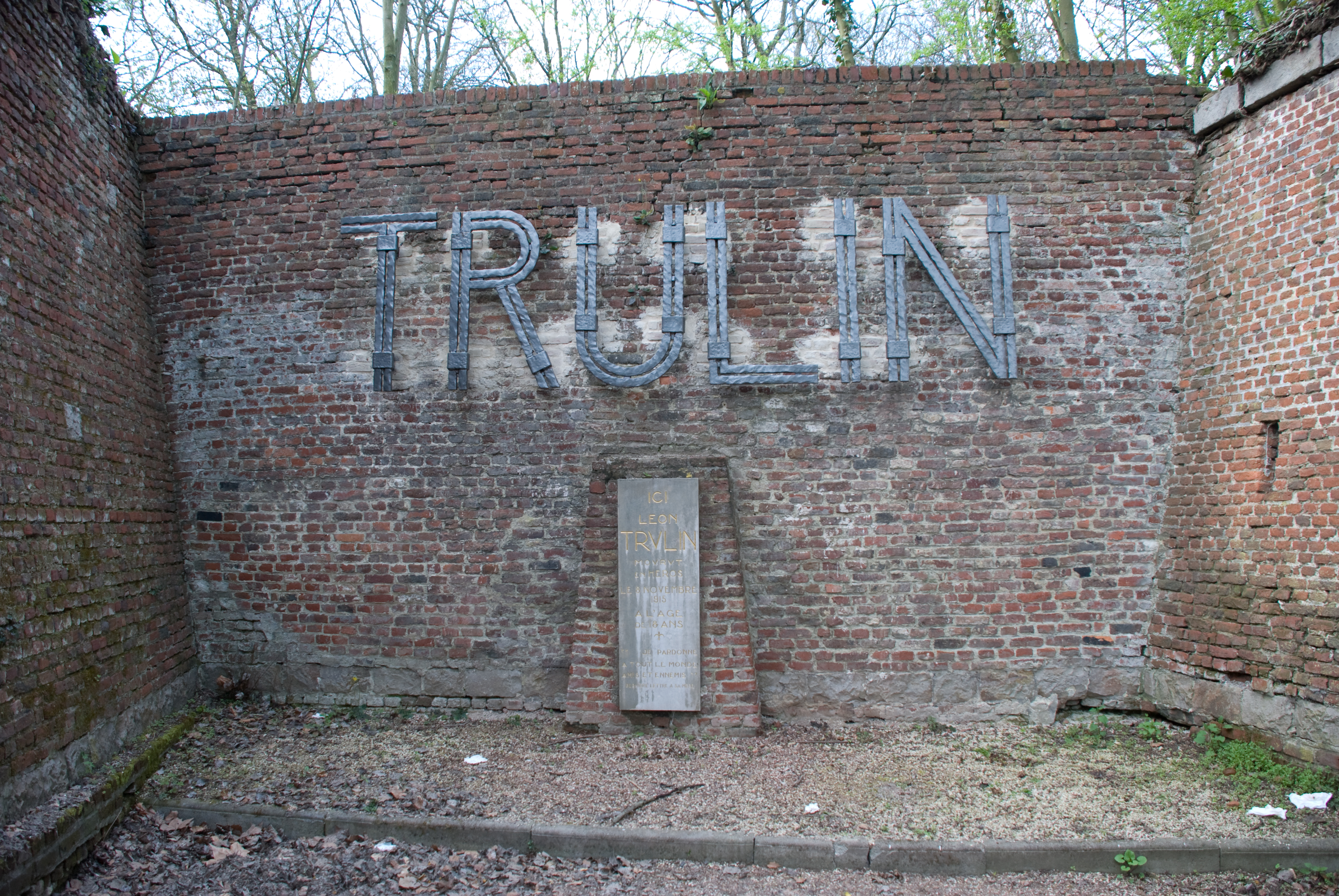
Monument on the North wall of the Citadel of Lille

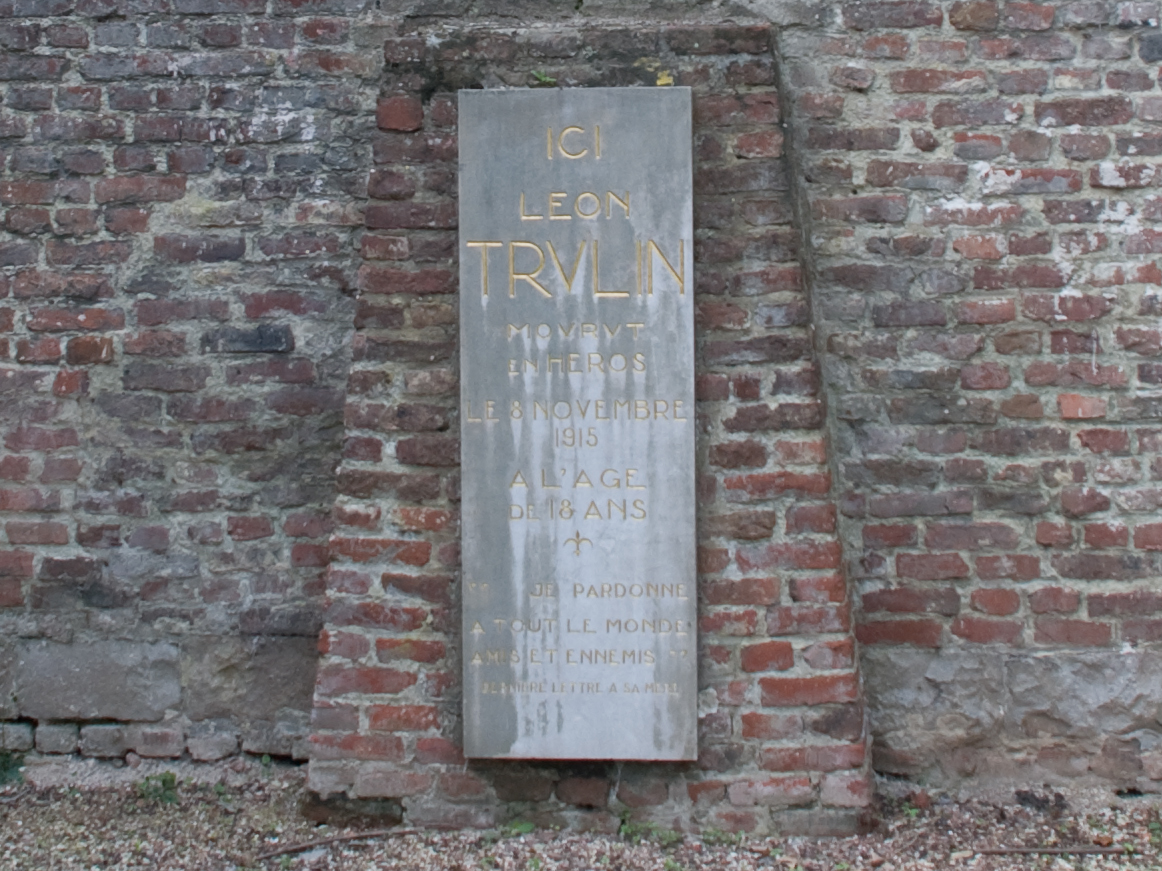
The memorial plaque

Four monuments among which three statues recall his memory in Lille:

- Statue in the group statue 'Les Fusillés lillois', by Félix-Alexandre Desruelles, square Daubenton. Unveiled on 31 March 1929.
- Statue by Edgar-Henri Boutry, unveiled in 1934 on the 'peuple belge' avenue, and moved in 2003 in the Léon Trulin street.
- Inscription " TRULIN " with large metal letters and memorial plaque at the location of his execution, on the north wall of the citadel. The text, in golden letters over concrete background, is : " Ici Leon Trvlin movrvt en heros le 8 novembre 1915 a l'age de 18 ans / "je pardonne a tout le monde, amis et ennemis" / derniere lettre a sa mere " which translates to 'Here Leon Trulin died as a hero on 8 November 1915 at the age of 18 I forgive everybody, friends and enemies, last letter to his mother.
- Statue by Félix-Alexandre Desruelles, at cimetière de l'Est (Lille), allée K7
