= Claude Coppens =

Belgian musician (born 1936)

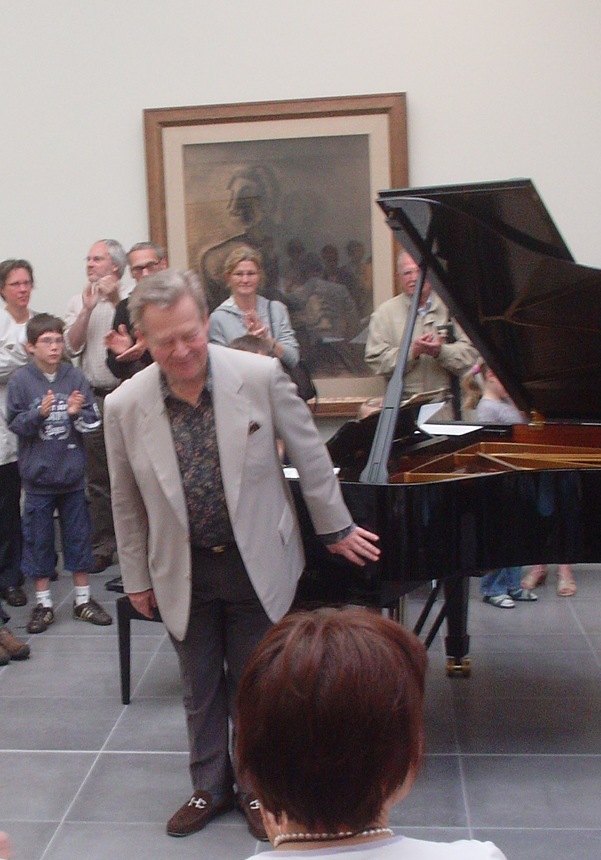
Claude Coppens in 2007, Museum of Fine Arts, Ghent

Claude Coppens (born 23 December 1936, Schaerbeek, commune of Brussels) is a Belgian pianist and composer.

Coppens studied at the Royal Conservatory in Brussels with Marcel Maas and in Paris with Marguerite Long.

He is a Laureate of the Marguerite Long Competition (1955), the Queen Elisabeth Music Competition for Piano (1956), and the International Piano Competition in Rio de Janeiro (1957), where he performed the first piano concerto of Heitor Villa-Lobos, conducted by Eleazar de Carvalho, and for which he received the Villa-Lobos prize.

As an interpreter he is known for his faithfulness to the original intentions of the composer. John Cage's music for prepared piano was executed by him after several exchanges with the composer about the exact way to do the "preparation." He extensively studied Erik Satie's music so that when he played the integral piano works of Satie in two consecutive sessions in 1995 (only abbreviating the Vexations), he revealed several more piano pieces by this composer, not known to the public until that day.

In 1960 Coppens obtained a doctorate in law from the Vrije Universiteit te Brussel (VUB).
