= Charles Virion =

French painter

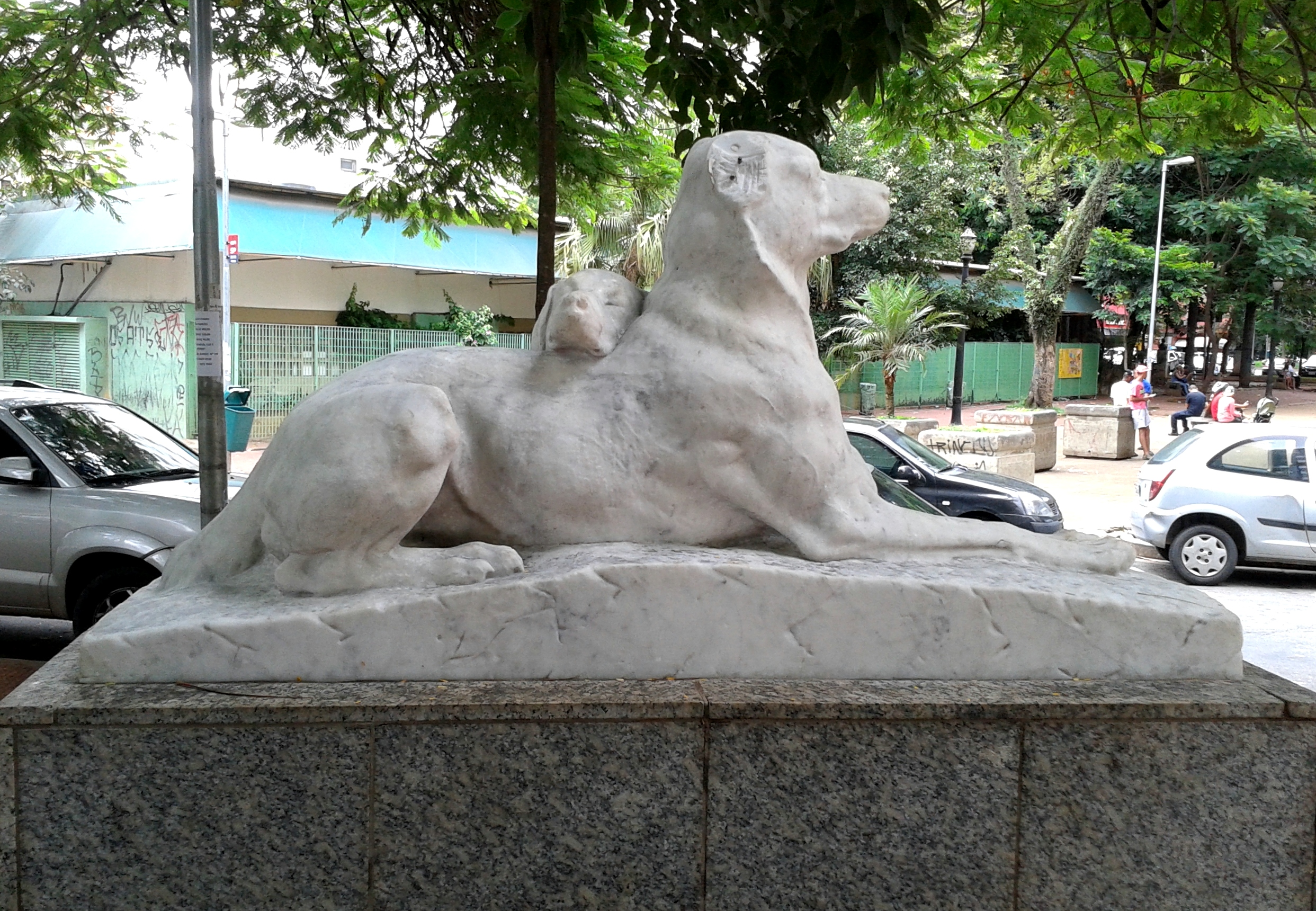
Mother's Love. Public statue by Charles Virion at Largo do Arouche, in São Paulo, Brazil.

Charles Louis Eugène Virion (Ajaccio, 1 December 1865 - Montigny-sur-Loing, 30 December 1946) was a noted French sculptor, medallist, and ceramicist, principally of animals.

Virion studied sculpture in Paris under Jean-Paul Aubé and Charles Gauthier and exhibited at the Salon des Artistes Français from 1886 until the 1930s. He was awarded a distinction in 1893 and became a member the same year. He won a third-class medal in 1895. At the Paris Exposition Universelle of 1900 he won a bronze medal. He also exhibited at the Salon des Animaliers after 1913.

After the First World War, he made memorials for several municipalities including those of Montigny-sur-Loing, Nemours, La Genevraye and Arbonne-la-Forêt.

== See also ==
- Armand Point
