= Albert Darcq =

French sculptor

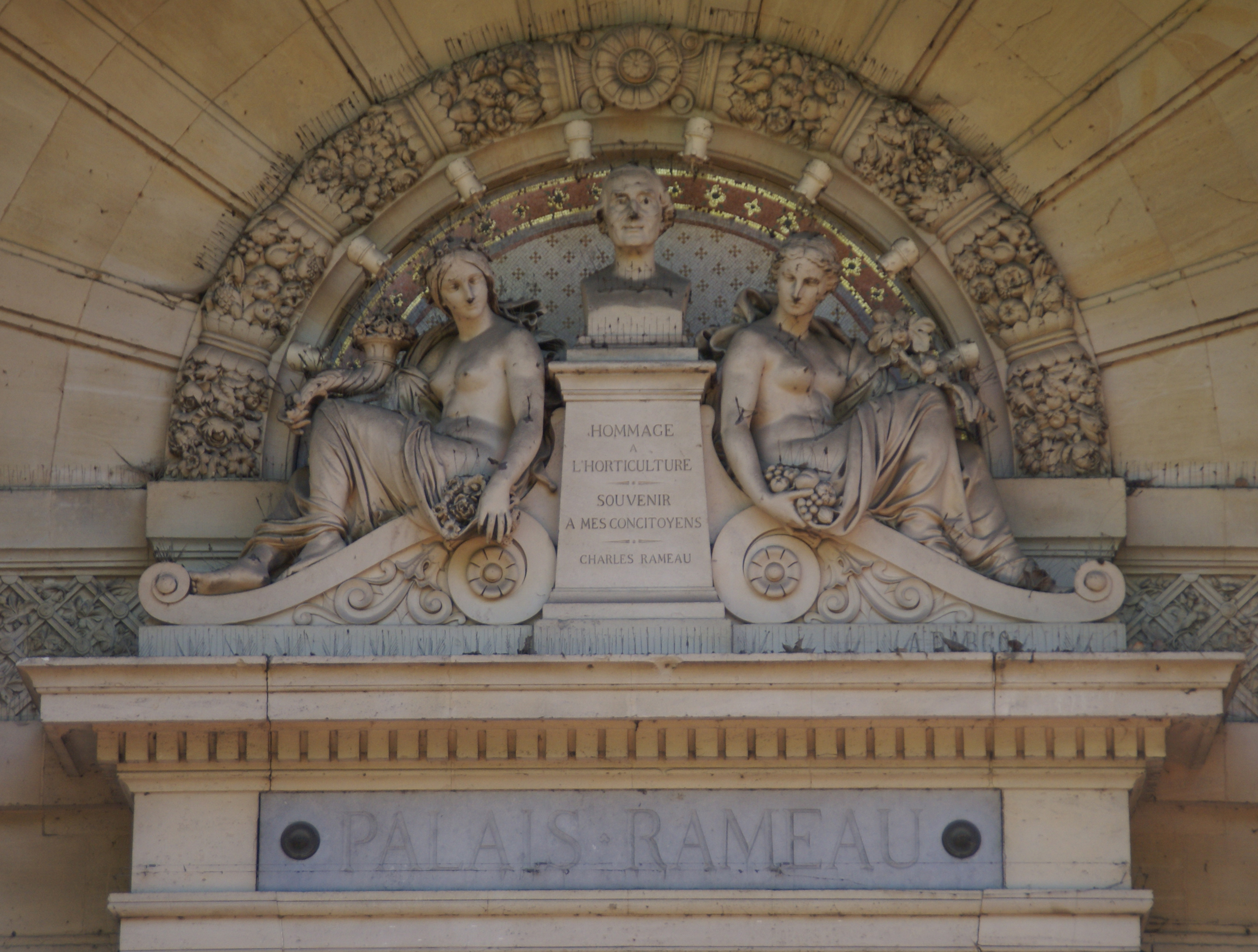
Sculpture by Darcq at the Rameau Palace.

Albert Darcq (Lille, 8 September 1848 - 8 March 1895) was a French sculptor who was trained by Pierre-Jules Cavelier. He exhibited at the Salon de Paris, and at the Salon des Artistes Français between 1874 and 1892. His 1874 marble medallion Portrait was his first exhibited work. He was awarded the third prize medal in 1881. His pupils included Edgar-Henri Boutry.

== Sculpture of Cleopatra ==
Following restoration, a plaster sculpture of the suicide of Cleopatra, previously thought to be by Darcq, was revealed to be a work by Charles Gauthier after Gauthier's signature was discovered during cleaning.
