= Charles Gauthier =

French sculptor

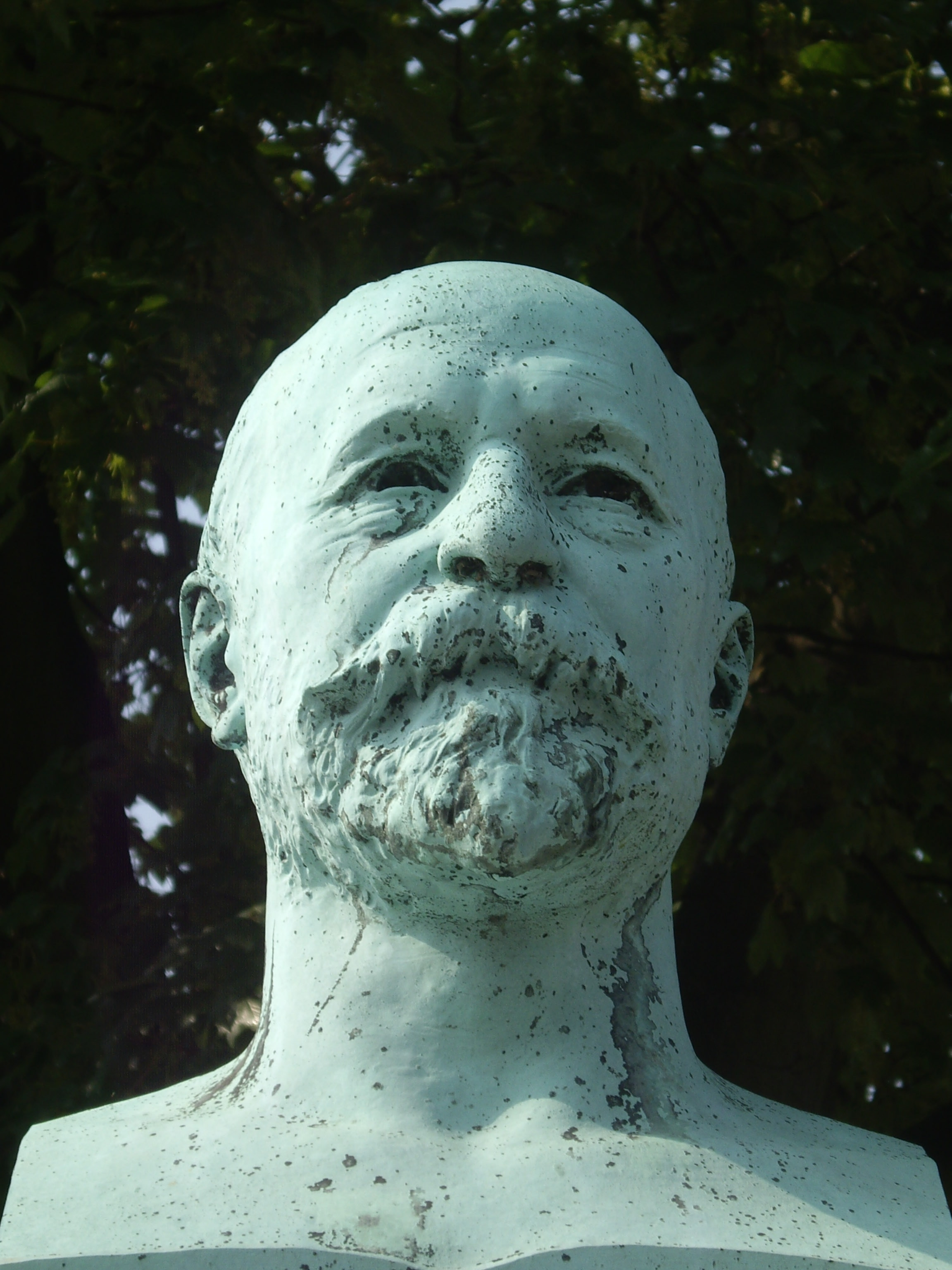
Bust of Charles Gauthier at his tomb

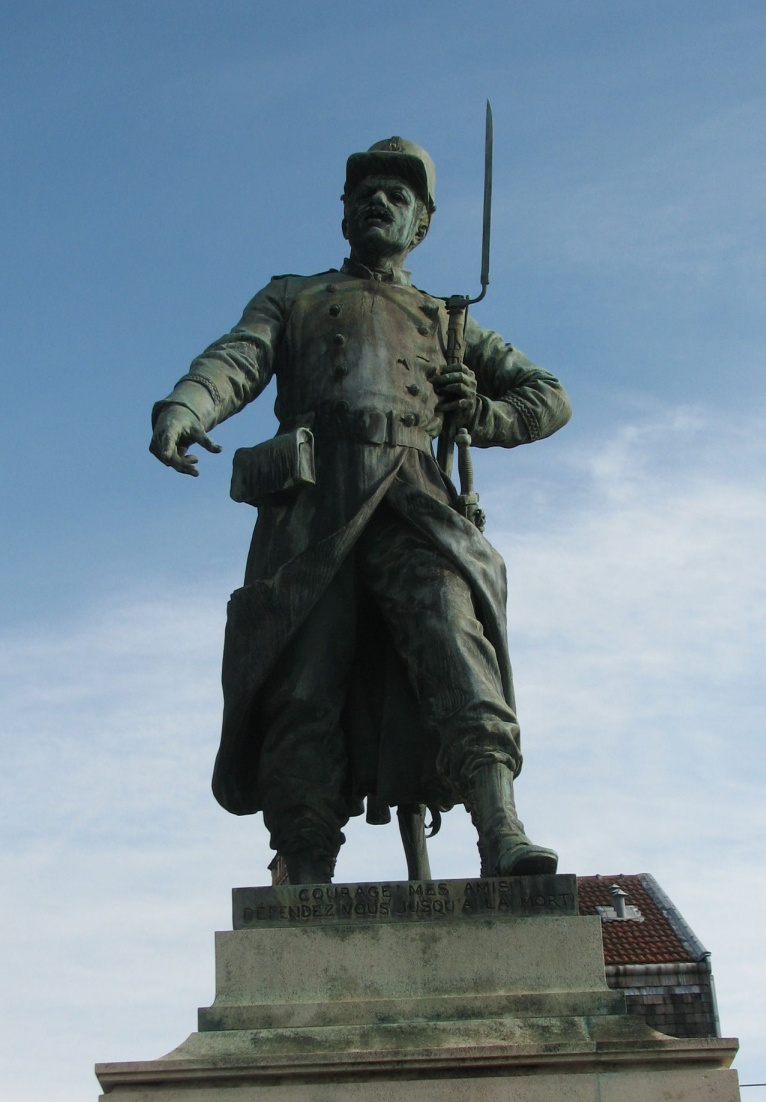
Sergent Blandan. c. 1886–87. Rue Sergent Blandan, Nancy.

Charles Gauthier (French pronunciation: [ʃaʁl ɡotje]; 7 December 1831 – 5 January 1891) was a French sculptor who was made a Chevalier of the Légion d'Honneur in 1872.

== Career ==
Gauthier was born in Chauvirey-le-Châtel. He enrolled at the École des Beaux-Arts in Paris on 6 April 1854, where he studied under François Jouffroy. He won a silver medal at the 1861 Prix de Rome and was awarded medals in 1865, 1866 and 1869. He exhibited at the Salon between 1859 and 1882. He died in Paris.

Gauthier's allegorical statue entitled Moderation was placed in the foyer of the Paris Opera House in 1873. A plaster model for the statue exists in the collections of the Musée d'Orsay. His Young Poacher (Fr. Jeune braconnier) is on display in the grounds of the Château de Fontainebleau.

== Sculpture of Cleopatra ==
Following restoration, a plaster sculpture of the suicide of Cleopatra, previously thought to be by Albert Darcq, was revealed to be a work by Charles Gauthier after Gauthier's signature was discovered during cleaning. The sculpture was acquired by the French government from the Salon of 1880, then sent to the French embassy in Tunis, then to Lille (home of Darcq) in 1886 and finally to the Palais des Beaux-Arts de Lille where the restoration took place.

== Statue of Sergent Blandan ==
The statue of Sergent Blandan (Jean Pierre Hippolyte Blandan), French army hero of Algeria, was commissioned from Gauthier following a public competition. The statue once stood in Boufarik, but following Algerian independence it was moved to France in 1963, where it was placed in the courtyard of a barracks in Nancy. In 1990, it was moved to Rue du Sergent Blandan in Nancy.

== Selected works ==
- Charlemagne. Bronze. Collegiate church of St-Quentin.
- Our Lady of Humility. Plaster. Church at Argenteuil.
- St Matthew. Stone. Church of the Trinity.
- Young Poacher. 1872. Marble. Château de Fontainebleau.
- Moderation. 1873. Paris Opera House.
- Andromeda. 1875. Marble. Musée d'Orsay.
- Cleopatra. 1880. Plaster. Palais des Beaux-Arts de Lille.
- Sergent Blandan. c. 1886–87. Rue Sergent Blandan, Nancy.

== See also ==
- Charles Virion
