= Montigny-sur-Loing station =

Railway station in Montigny-sur-Loing, France

Montigny-sur-Loing
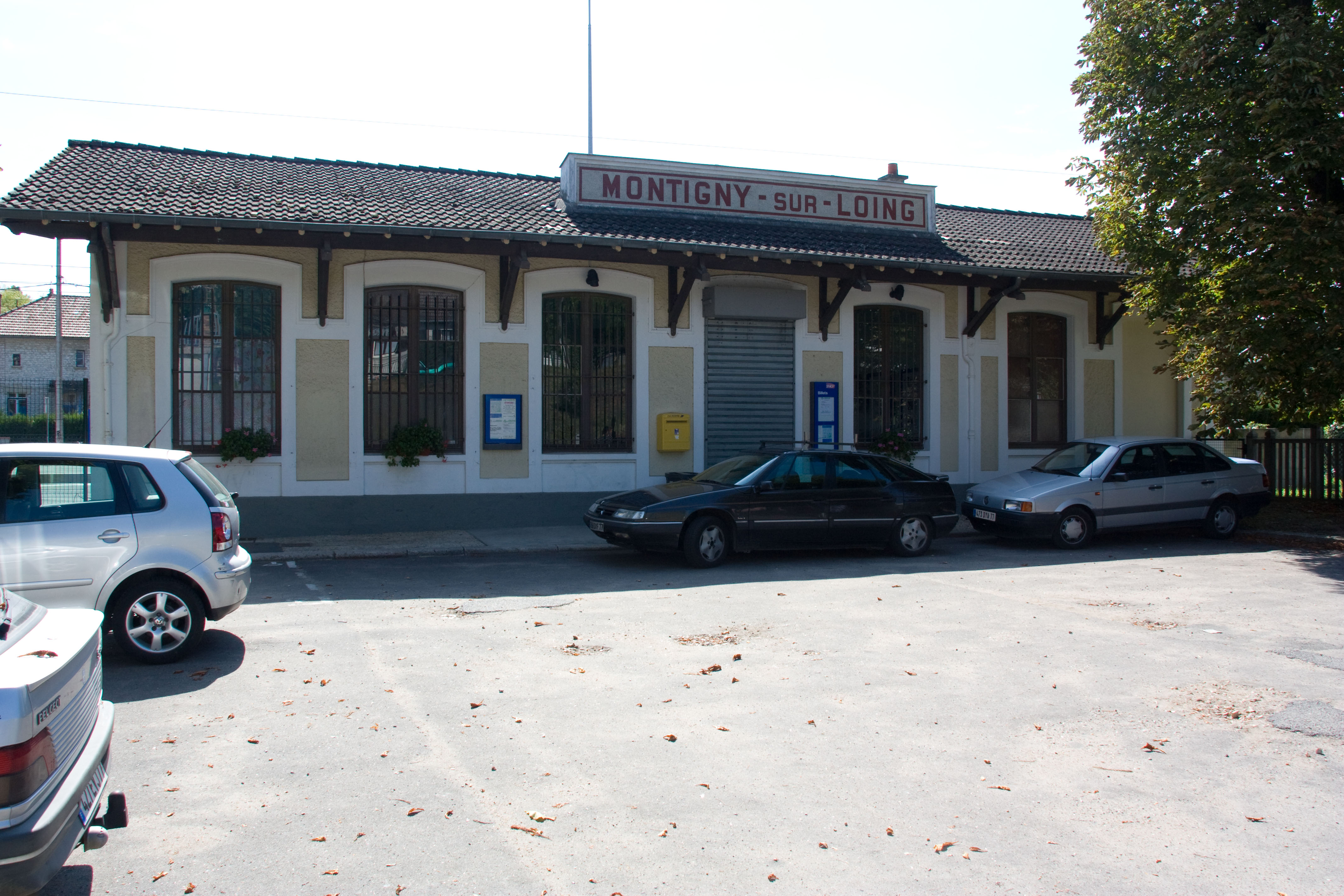
- Gare de Montigny-sur-Loing

General information
- Location: Montigny-sur-Loing, Seine-et-Marne, Île-de-France; France
- Coordinates: 48°20′11″N 2°44′19″E
- Line: Moret-Lyon railway
- Platforms: 2
- Tracks: 2

Other information
- Station code: 87684100
- Fare zone: 5

History
- Opened: 1860

Services
Preceding station	Transilien	Following station
Moret-Veneux-les-Sablons towards Paris-Lyon	Line R	Bourron-Marlotte-Grez towards Montargis
Location

Montigny-sur-Loing is a railway station in Montigny-sur-Loing, Île-de-France, France. The station opened in 1860 and is on the Moret–Lyon railway. The station is served by Transilien line R (Paris-Gare de Lyon) operated by SNCF.

== Gallery ==
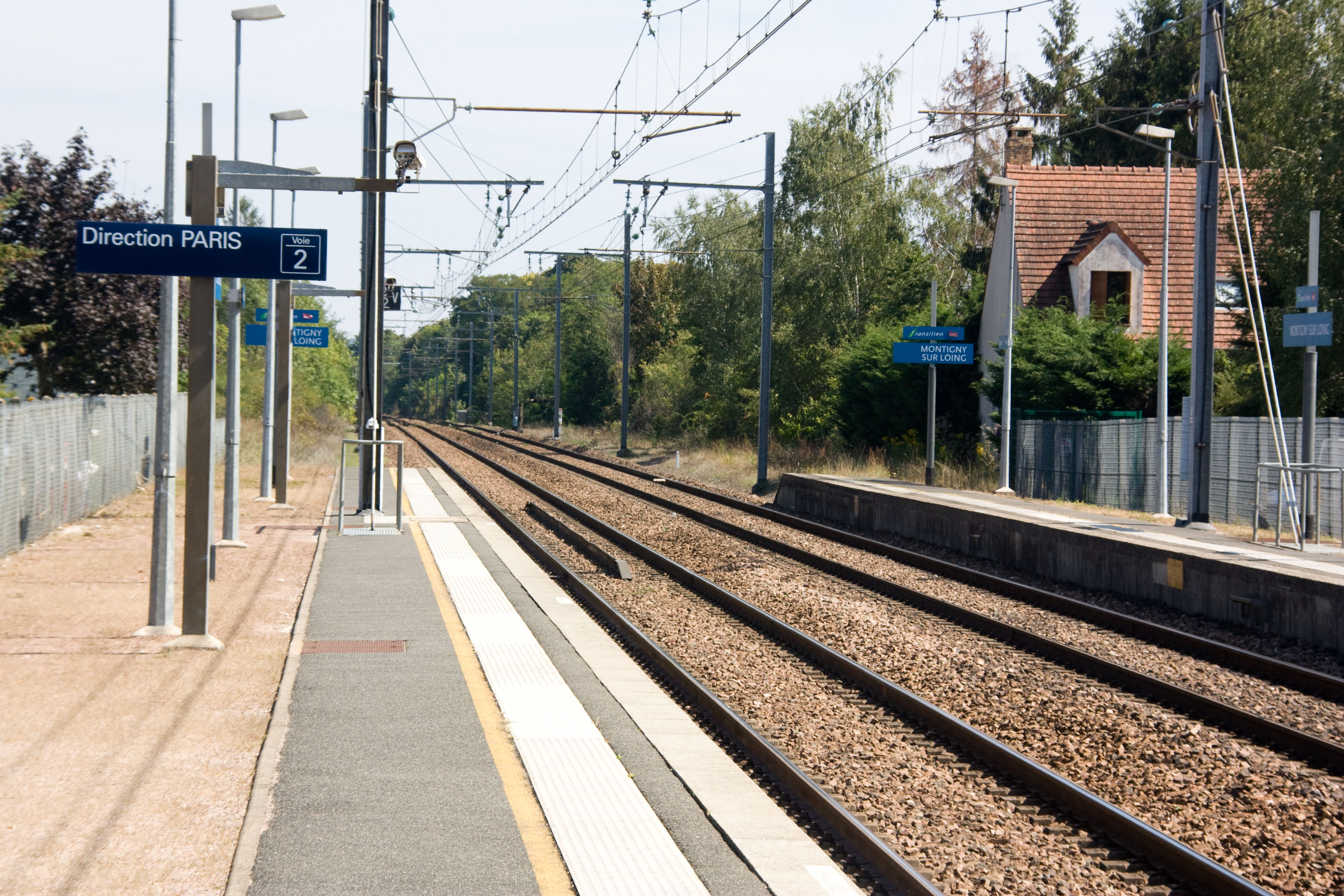
The station

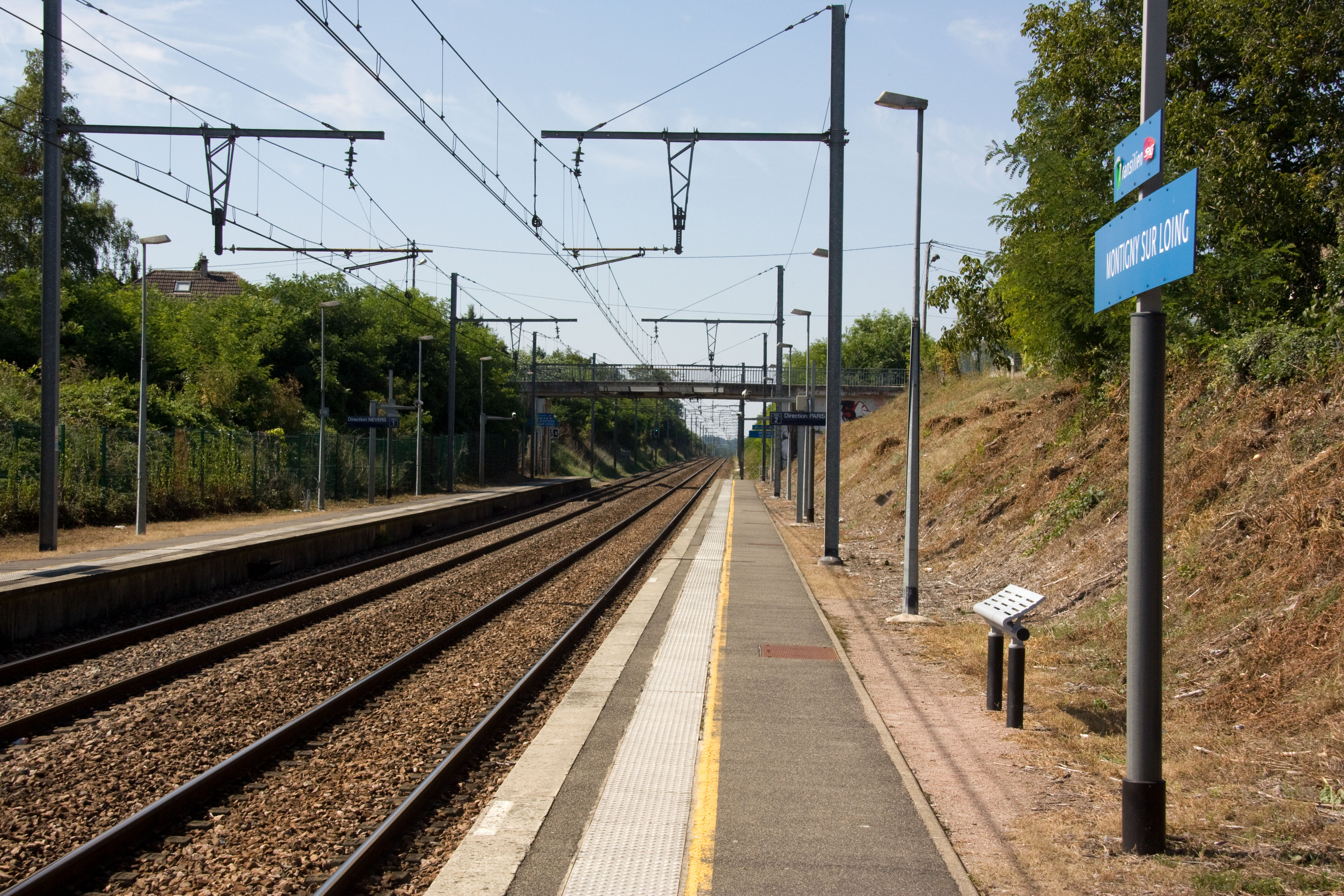
The station

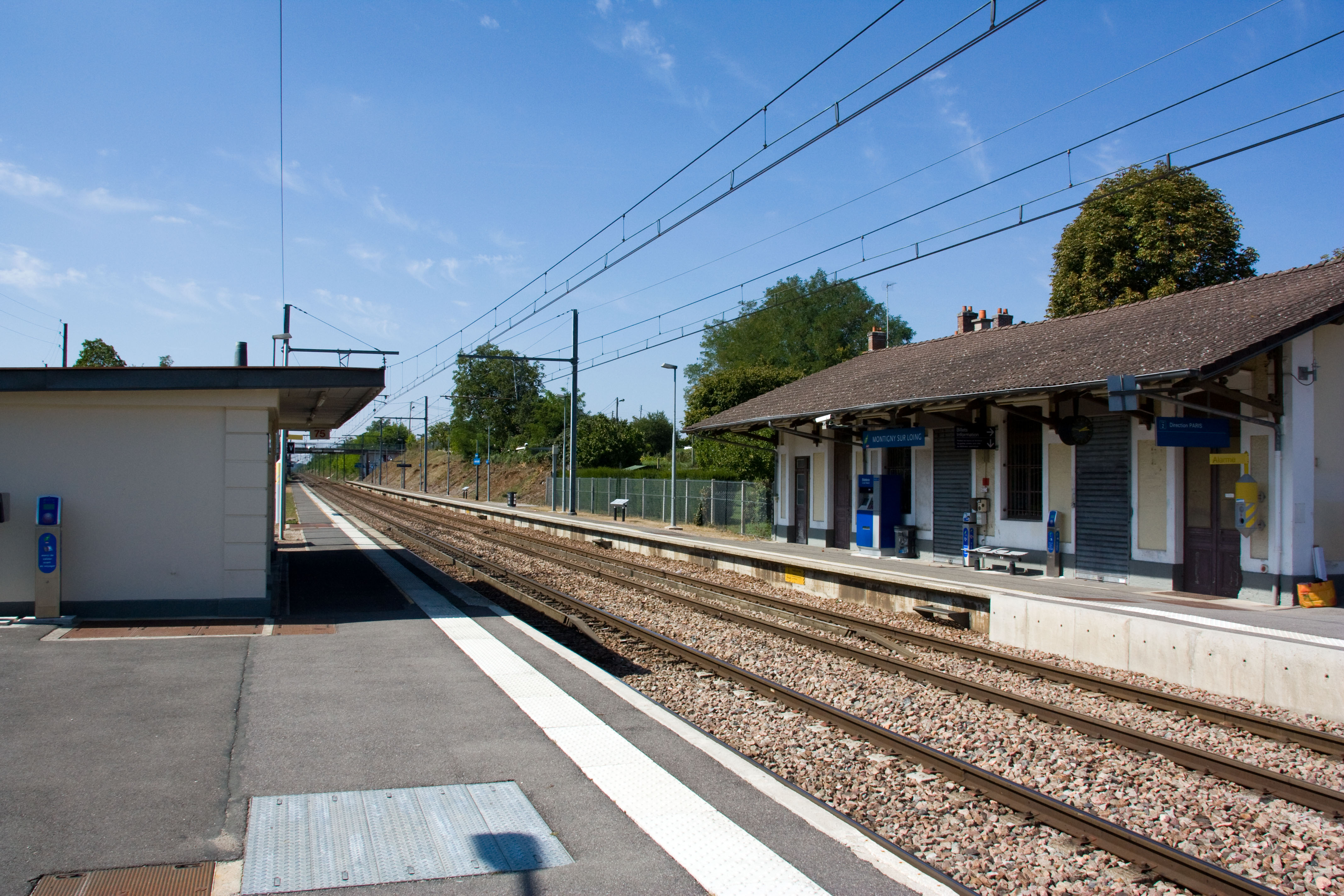
The station

== See also ==
- Transilien Paris–Lyon
