= Chauvirey-le-Châtel =

- Commune
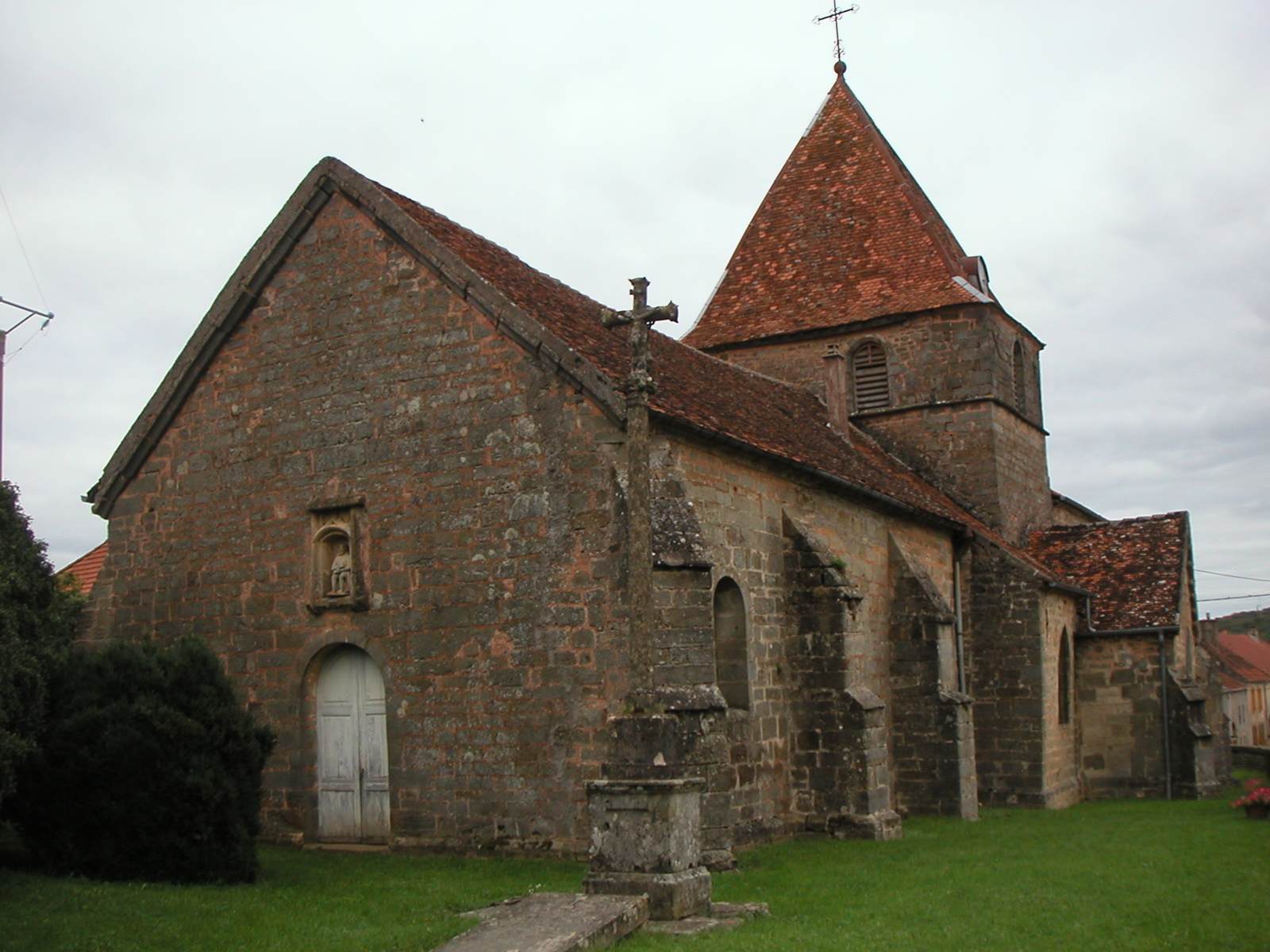
- The church in Chauvirey-le-Châtel

- Coat of arms
- Location of Chauvirey-le-Châtel
- Location within France Location within Bourgogne-Franche-Comté
- Coordinates: 47°47′31″N 5°45′20″E
- Country: France
- Region: Bourgogne-Franche-Comté
- Department: Haute-Saône
- Arrondissement: Vesoul
- Canton: Jussey
- Area^{1}: 11.76 km^{2} (4.54 sq mi)
- Highest elevation: 372 m (1,220 ft)
- Lowest elevation: 238 m (781 ft)
- Population (2023): 109
  - Density: 9.27/km^{2} (24.0/sq mi)
- Time zone: UTC+01:00 (CET)
  - Summer (DST): UTC+02:00 (CEST)
- INSEE/Postal code: 70143 /70500
- ^{1} French Land Register data, which excludes lakes, ponds, glaciers > 1 km^{2} (0.386 sq mi or 247 acres) and river estuaries.

Chauvirey-le-Châtel is a commune in the Haute-Saône department in the region of Bourgogne-Franche-Comté in eastern France.

== Notable people ==
- Charles Gauthier (1831-1891), sculptor

== See also ==
- Communes of the Haute-Saône department
