= Edgar-Henri Boutry =

French artist (1857–1938)

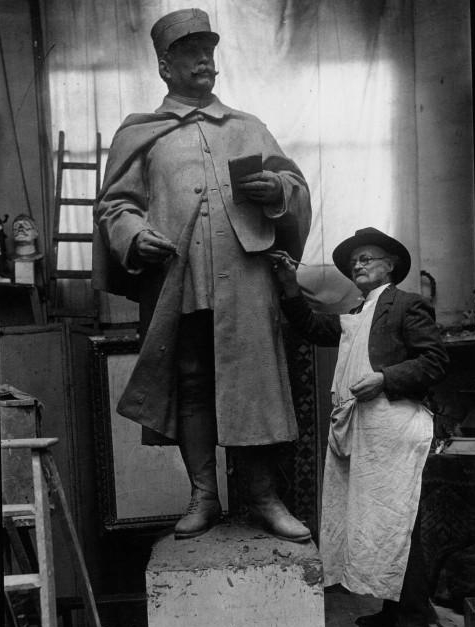
Boutry working on his statue of Maréchal Joffre

Edgar Boutry (1857–1938) was a French sculptor who executed several public statues and monuments and worked on several Monuments aux Morts. He also ran the Écoles académiques lilloises.

== Early years and studies ==
Boutry was born in Lille and died at Levallois-Perret. He was a pupil of Albert Darcq at the Écoles académiques lilloises and then of Jules Cavelier at the École des Beaux-Arts in Paris. He was runner up for the "Prix de Rome" in 1885 and won the prize in 1887. He was eventually to succeed Albert Darcq at the Écoles académiques lilloises. During his lifetime he was responsible for a number of public statues in Lille and in other parts of Northern France. His work also decorates several town halls, as well as a hotel and several churches.

=== Monument aux morts and other works related to the Great War 1914-1918 ===
Work	Location	Subject, notes and references
Statue of Maréchal Joffre	Chantilly, Oise	Boutry completed this statue of Maréchal Joffre in 1930. It is located near to the Chantilly monument aux morts and the Maréchal himself was present at the inauguration. Chantilly decided to honour the Maréchal with this statue as he had been resident at the Hôtel du Grand Condé et Villa Poiret in Chantilly from December 1914 to December 1916, whilst Généralissimo of the French Army and Chantilly was proud of that historic connection.
The monument aux morts at Chéreng	Chéreng, Nord	Boutry's composition depicts a dead soldier lying on his back and draped in a flag. He lies at the base of a pedestal upon which there is a bronze depiction of the "Angel of Victory" distributing palm leaves. Just above the dead soldier is a quotation from Victor Hugo. "Ceux qui pieusement sont morts pour la Patrie Ont droit qu'à leur cercueil la foule vienne et prie"
Monument remembering the victims of the explosion in 1916 at 18 ponts	Lille, Nord	In 1916 an explosion had ripped apart the arsenal at "18 Ponts" in Lille. Many lives were lost and much damage caused to the surrounding area. The monument is situated at the point where the rues de Valenciennes and de Douai cross. The monument features a bas-relief showing the dead being carried away after the explosion.
The equestrian statue of Maréchal Foch at Cassel	Cassel, Nord	The sculptor Georges Malissard was responsible for the sculpture of Foch riding a horse which was exhibited in Paris in June 1928. The statue was inaugurated on 7 July 1928. The Foch sculpture rests on a pedestal which has relief work by Boutry. The inscription on the pedestal reads "Au Maréchal Foch, la ville de Cassel et les Flandres reconnaissantes" Cassel was where Foch based his headquarters in October 1914 when he was given command of the Allied forces in Northern France. Arthur Lepers was the architect who designed the statue and the Andro foundry worked on the casting in bronze.
The equestrian statue of Maréchal Foch at Lille	Lille, Nord	This time Boutry was the sculptor of the bronze of the horsed Foch. The work is located in the square Foch in Lille.
Lille War Memorial	Lille, Nord	When Lille organised a competition for designs for her monument aux morts, the work "Melancolia" was submitted by the architect Jacques Alleman and Edgar Boutry and, with some modifications, was accepted. In the original design several bas-reliefs were proposed which depicted scenes from the most dramatic events of the Great War in Lille. The design had included the episode when several civilians were shot as spies, the explosion at the "18 Ponts" arsenal, the taking of hostages by the Germans and the execution of the Belgian Léon Trulin. However the decision was made that some of these events would be marked by a separate monument and a programme was drawn up which would see the erection of the memorial to the citizens of Lille shot as spies ("Le monument aux fusillés lillois"), this located at the junction of the boulevards Vauban et de la Liberté, the memorial remembering the role played by carrier pigeons in the war, which was erected at the entrance to the Bois de Boulogne, the monument remembering Louise de Bettignies which was erected at the beginning of the Grand Boulevard, and the memorial to the dead of the "18 Ponts" explosion, erected at the end of the rue de Douai, with an equestrian statue of Foch completing the programme. Thus the scenes depicted on the monument aux morts were changed to be of a more general and allegorical nature. The themes were peace, the relief of the city from German occupation and the taking of prisoners. The dedication was specifically chosen to cover all the victims of the war, soldiers and civilians and read " Aux Lillois, soldats et civils, la cité a élevé ce monument afin de rappeler au cours des siècles l’héroïsme et les souffrances de ses enfants morts pour la Paix" Incidentally it was Félix-Alexandre Desruelles who was finally commissioned to sculpt the "Le monument aux fusillés lillois". This monument was inaugurated in 1929 in the square Daubenton and honours the merchant Georges Maertens, sub-lieutenant Ernest Deceuninck, the workman Silvère Ver-huslt and another merchant Eugène Jacquet, all shot as spies on 22 September 1915. The monument also includes Léon Trulin. Alexandre Descatoire was the sculptor of the memorial to carrier pigeons.
Racing Club de Roubaix	Roubaix, Nord	Boutry executed the monument aux morts dedicated to those Racing Club players who had lost their lives the Great War. Racing Club de Roubaix is a soccer team. The monument features a bronze statue of a young Roubaix player lifting his sword in the air with the French flag held in the other hand. The monument is located in the Dubrulle-Verriest Stadium in the rue Lecomte Baillon.
The monument aux morts at Annappes.	Annappes, Nord	The conglomeration of Villeneuve d'Ascq has four monument aux morts; at Annappes, Ascq, Flers-Bourg and Flers-Breucq. That at Annappes features a bronze bas-relief by Boutry. In his composition Boutry depicts a woman wearing a shroud who leans over the body of a dead soldier. She holds a palm leaf. The soldier still holds the French flag in his left hand and his right hand rests on his rifle. The surrounding scenery suggests that the soldier lays in the trench area as we can see barbed wire and a desolate tree shorn of any greenery. This monument dates to 1920
The monument aux morts at Armentières	Armentières, Nord	The architect Louis-Marie Cordonnier had been commissioned in 1924 to plan the reconstruction of the centre of Armentières, and this included a monument aux morts. Armentières had been devastated during the Great War with a huge destruction of property. 400 civilians had been killed, 1,070 civilians wounded and 1,116 men of Armentières had fallen on the battlefields. The monument aux morts, designed by both Louis-Marie Cordonnier and his father, was erected in 1925 with the dedication. "À la mémoire de ses glorieux enfants morts pour la patrie" The monument takes the form of a pyramid with three bas-reliefs by Boutry which depict "Mobilisation", "The Battle" and "The Return". At the base of the pyramid a soldier had originally stood with his foot on an writhing German eagle, but this eagle was removed and destroyed by the Germans during the Second World War occupation. The monument includes a female representation of Armentières who holds out a crown for the soldier. At the back of the monument there is a second inscription "1914 – Souvenir des civils, fusillés et asphyxiés" reminding us of how the civilian population suffered as well as the soldiers
The monument aux morts at Mouvaux	Mouvaux, Nord	Located in Mouvaux cemetery, Boutry's monument aux mort has a bas-relief of a dying soldier.
Pont de Neuville Cemetery in Tourcoing	Tourcoing, Nord	This cemetery has work by Maxime Réal del Sarte and Henri Soubricas and a work by Boutry, completed in collaboration with the Tourcoing architects Maillard, which is dedicated to the soldiers of the East.
Statue of Léon Trulin	Lille, Nord	The statue of Léon Trulin in Lille is a work by Boutry and stands near to the Opéra de Lille building in the rue Léon Trulin. It was inaugurated in 1934. Trulin had been shot as a spy by the Germans.

=== Other works. Church Furnishing and architectural embellishments ===
Work	Location	Subject, notes and references
Hôtel de ville Dunkerque	Dunkerque, Nord	Boutry was one of the sculptors and painters who helped with the reconstruction of the Hôtel de ville after the Second World War during which the building suffered damage. The architect for this restoration was Louis-Stanilas Cordonnier. One of Boutry's works was a statue of Louis XIV on horseback. This is in a niche with a mosaic surround by J.D.Facchina.
Hôtel de ville at Roubaix	Roubaix, Nord	For this Town Hall Boutry executed two allegorical seated figures representing the themes of "Vigilance" and "Moderation".
Statue of "Le Sacré-Coeur"	Lille, Nord	For the church of Saint-André in the rue Royale, Boutry executed a sculpture entitled "Le Sacré-Coeur" in 1921. It was paid for by a parishioner of the church.
Bas-reliefs for the Saint Etienne altar.	Lille, Nord	For the church of Saint Etienne in the rue de l'Hôpital-Militaire, Boutry executed two bronze bas-reliefs in 1889 for the altar. The bas-reliefs were cast by the foundry Engels Frères. The bas-reliefs, placed on either side of the tabernacle, tell the story of the relics of St Etienne. One shows Gamaliel revealing to the priest Lucien the location of these relics and in the second we see the unearthing of those relics.
Saint Maurice church in Lille	Lille, Nord	For the church of Saint Maurice in the rue de Paris, Lille, Boutry carried out several commissions.
Hotel in Lyon	Lyon, Lyon Metropolis	For the Hôtel de Voyageurs in Lyon, now the Grand Hôtel Mercure Château Perrache, Boutry added 20 high-reliefs to some columns in what is now the hotel's reception area, These depicted birds and rustic scenes.
Piéta	Avelin, Aisne	For the church of St Quentin in Avelin, Boutry executed a Piéta in marble and also decorated the tomb of the Des Rotours family in the church.
Automobile reliefs on Paris building	Paris	The architect Georges Chedanne built a hotel and decided to decorate the outside of the building with reliefs linked to the automobile. The building is near the Etoile, at the corner of the rue de Presbourg and the avenue Kléber. Three sculptors worked on the reliefs, Paul Gasq, Edgar Boutry and François-Léon Sicard. Boutry executed two reliefs showing mechanics fixing cars.

=== Other works of art ===
- In the Palais des Beaux-Arts in Lille, there is an aquarelle painting of a violinist by Boutry which he executed in 1929.
- The work "Thésée rendant à Oedipe ses deux filles, Antigone et Ismène" was Boutry's submission for the "Prix de Rome de Sculpture" in 1887. It is now held by the Beaux-arts de Paris, l'école nationale supérieure.
- Boutry's submission for the Prix de Rome in 1888 was the copy of a work in the Musée du Louvre of a seated philosopher. It is a Ronde-Bosse in marble and plaster and is held by the Beaux-arts de Paris, l'école nationale supérieure.
- In the Lille Palais des Beaux-Arts there is a relief in bronze by Boutry which depicts A.Mourcou. It was executed in 1910.
- Boutry executed the bronze statue of Jeanne Maillotte which is located on the Avenue du Peuple Belge. Maillotte was an inn-keeper who became involved in the religious conflicts at the time between Catholics and Protestants. These conflicts often became physical and July 1582 saw the rebelling Protestants ("Les hurlus") attacking Lille. Jeanne urged her fellow citizens to repulse the hurlus, leading by example and the action was a success. Maillotte became something of a legend and is remembered by Boutry's statue, inaugurated 27 May 1935 and in local songs in particular that of Alexandre Desrousseaux who wrote the famous ballade "P'tit Quinquin".
- Boutry executed a marble bust of Eugène Guillaume who was a director of the École des Beaux-Arts in Lille. This work is now held in the Beaux-arts de Paris, l'école nationale supérieure.
- Boutry executed two large decorated vases that are situated besides the Promenade Chamars et Fort Chaudanne in Besançon.
- In the Levallois-Perret Cemetery near Paris, located in the place du 11 Novembre 1918, Boutry executed in 1920 a bronze relief portrait of Louis Mortier for the latter's tomb. This cemetery is located north-west of Paris.
- Boutry executed a bronze médaillon depicting Émile Vandenbergh. This is now in the Palais des Beaux-Arts in Lille.
- "L'Amour et la Folie" is a bronze bas-relief by Boutry now held in the Palais des Beaux-Arts in Lille.
- Boutry executed the allegorical work "Peace" in the Grand Foyer of the Lille Opera House.

=== Works featuring depictions of Edgar-Henri Boutry ===
In the Musée d'Orsay in Paris there is a bronze relief of Boutry by Frédéric de Vernon.

=== Images of Boutry's work ===
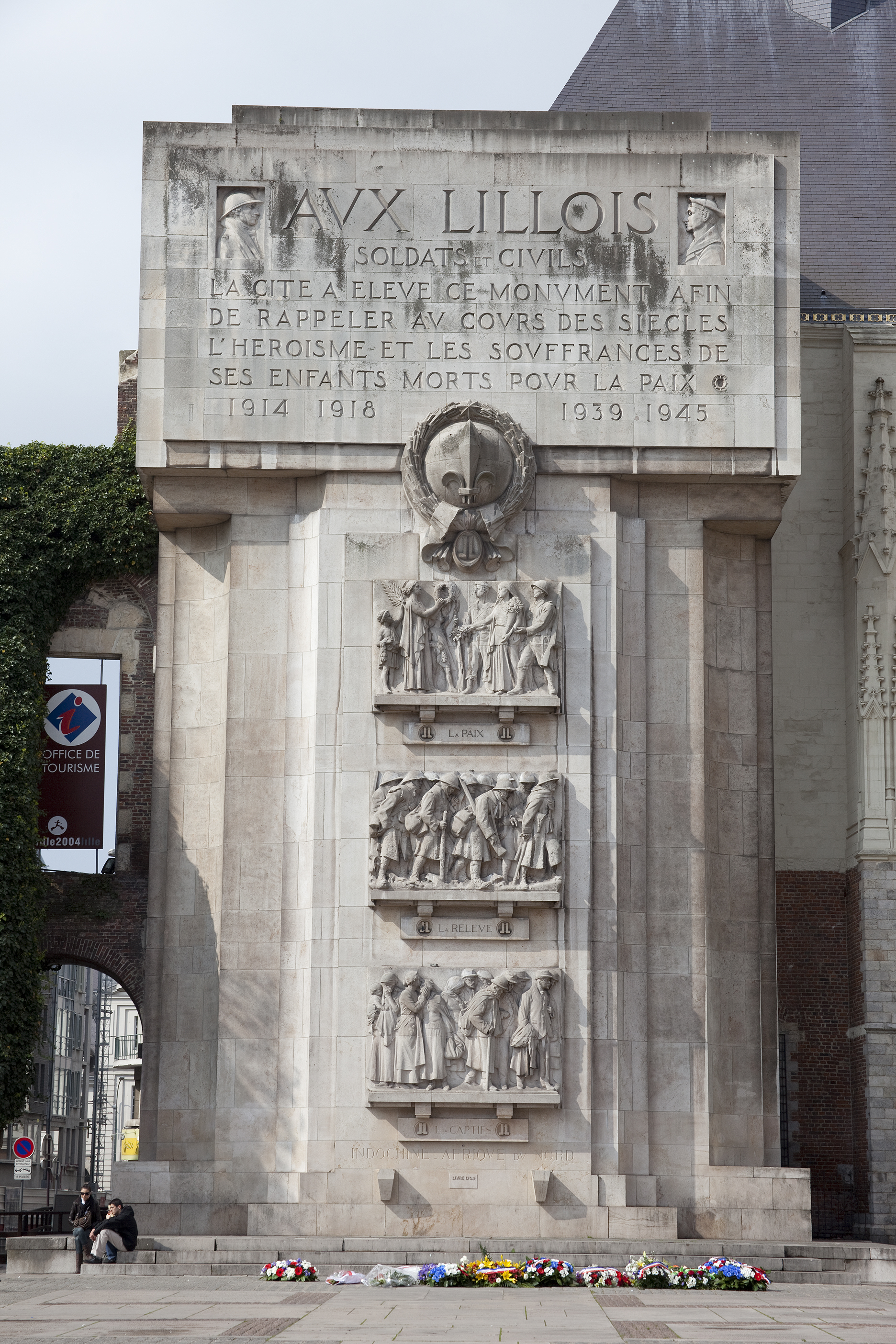
Lille War Memorial. Photograph courtesy David Sander

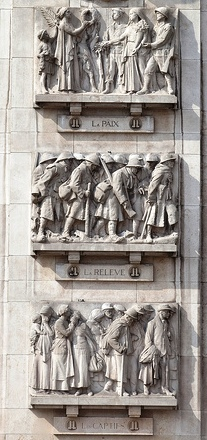
Three reliefs on Lille War Memorial. Courtesy David Sander.

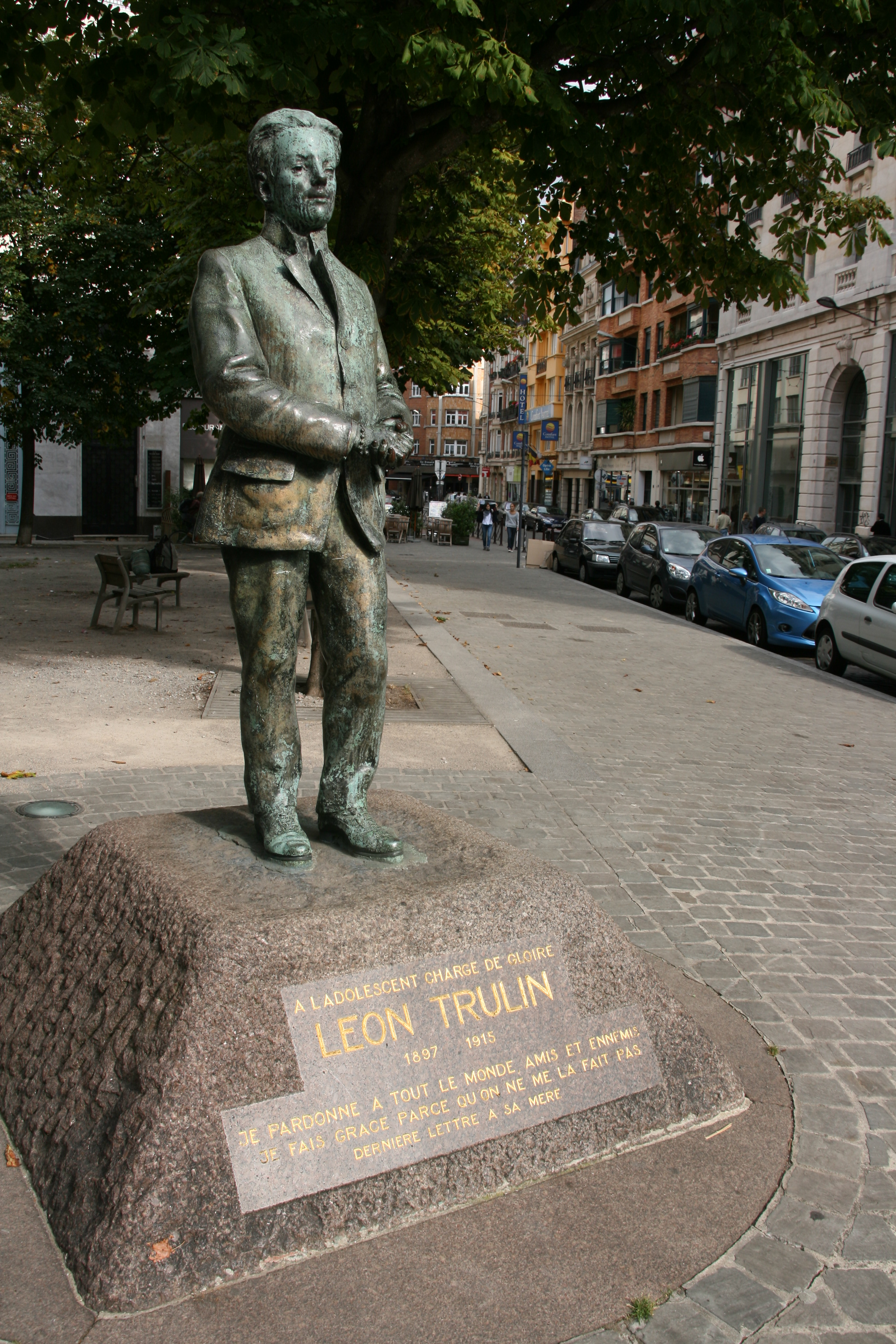
Léon Trulin. Shot by the Germans as a spy.

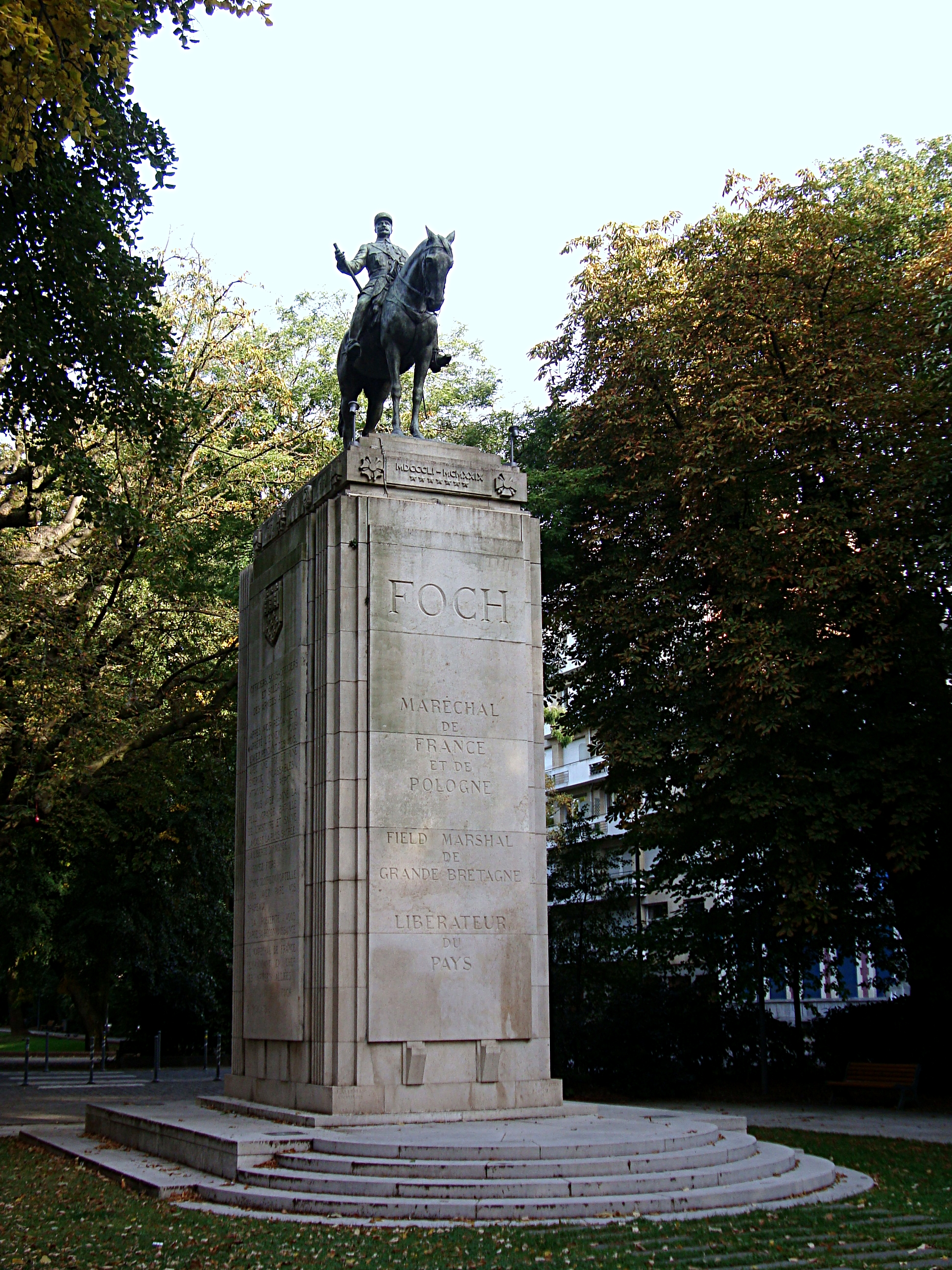
Statue of Foch in Lille. Photograph courtesy Velvet.

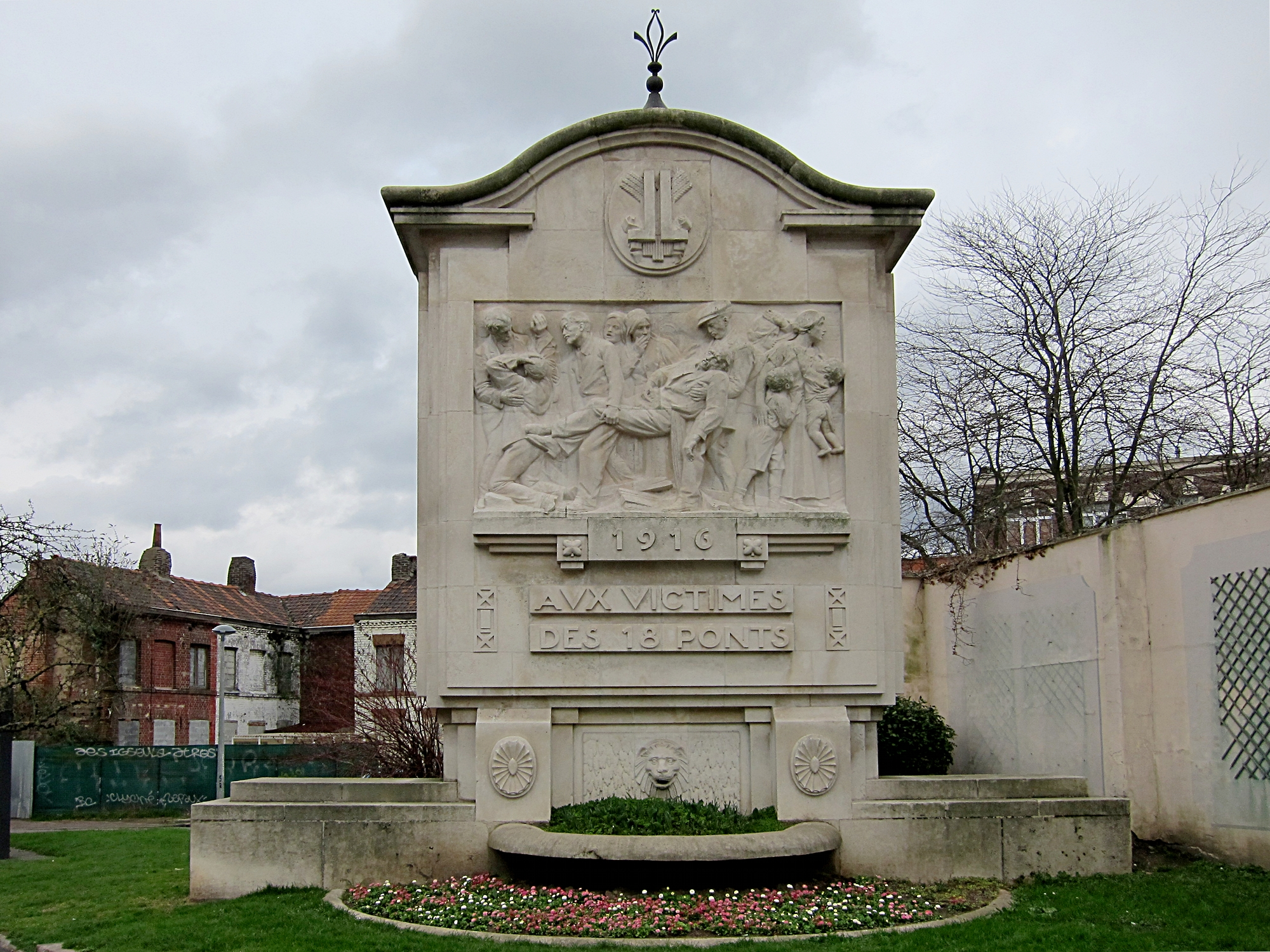
Monument to those killed in the explosion at 18 ponts.Photograph courtesy Velvet.

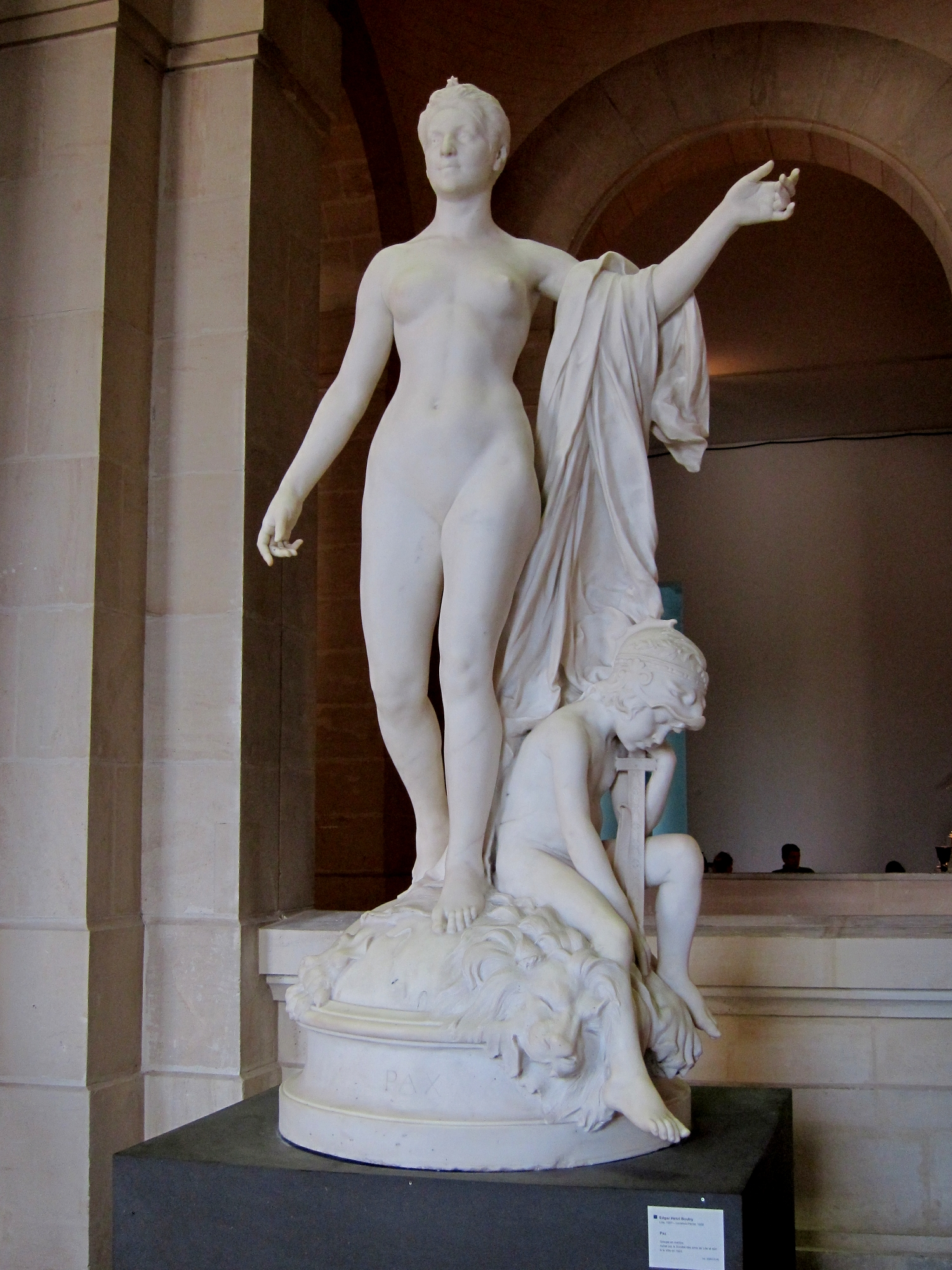
"Peace" by Boutry.Photograph courtesy Velvet.

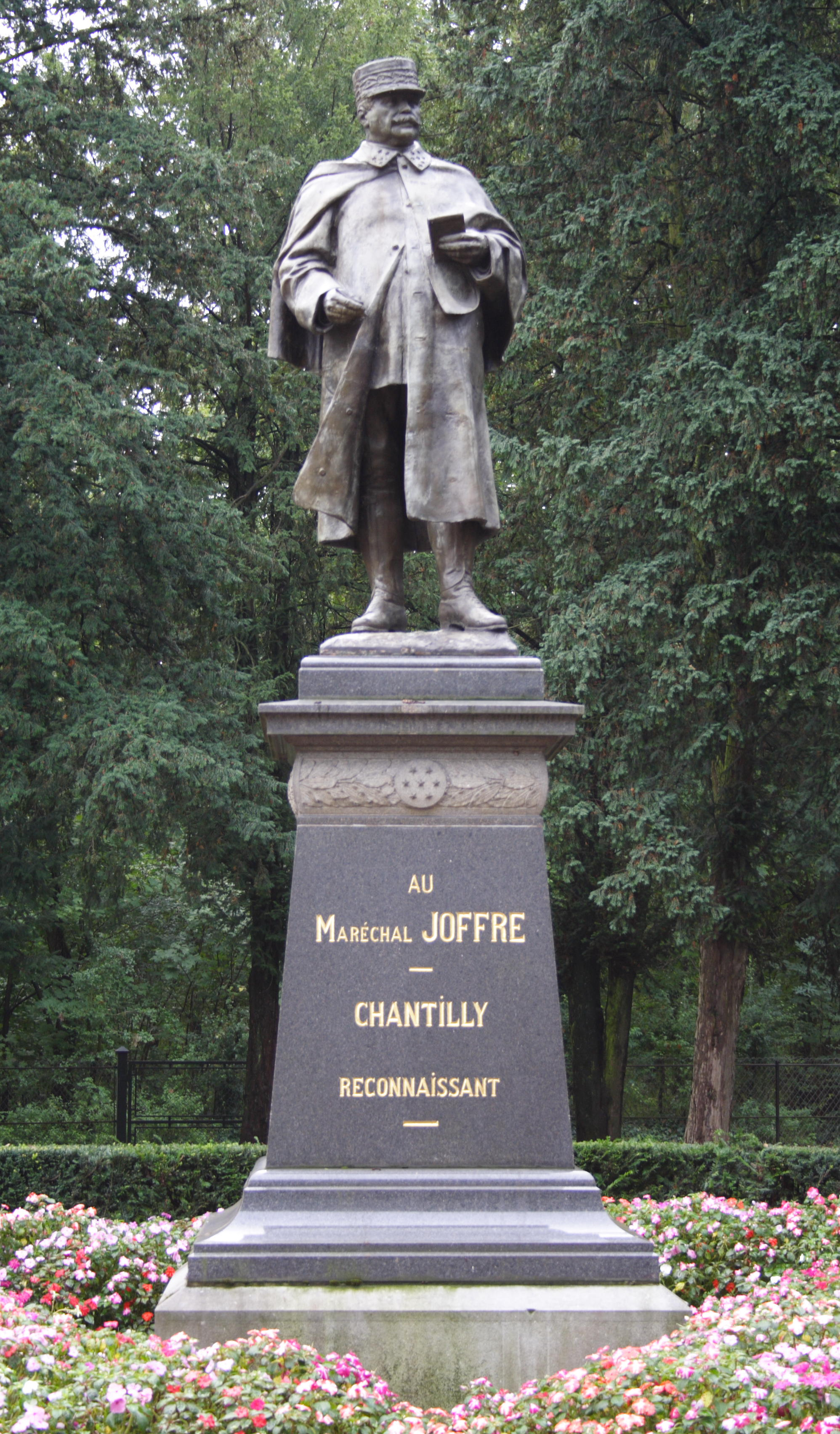
Maréchal Joffre. Photograph courtesy ignis

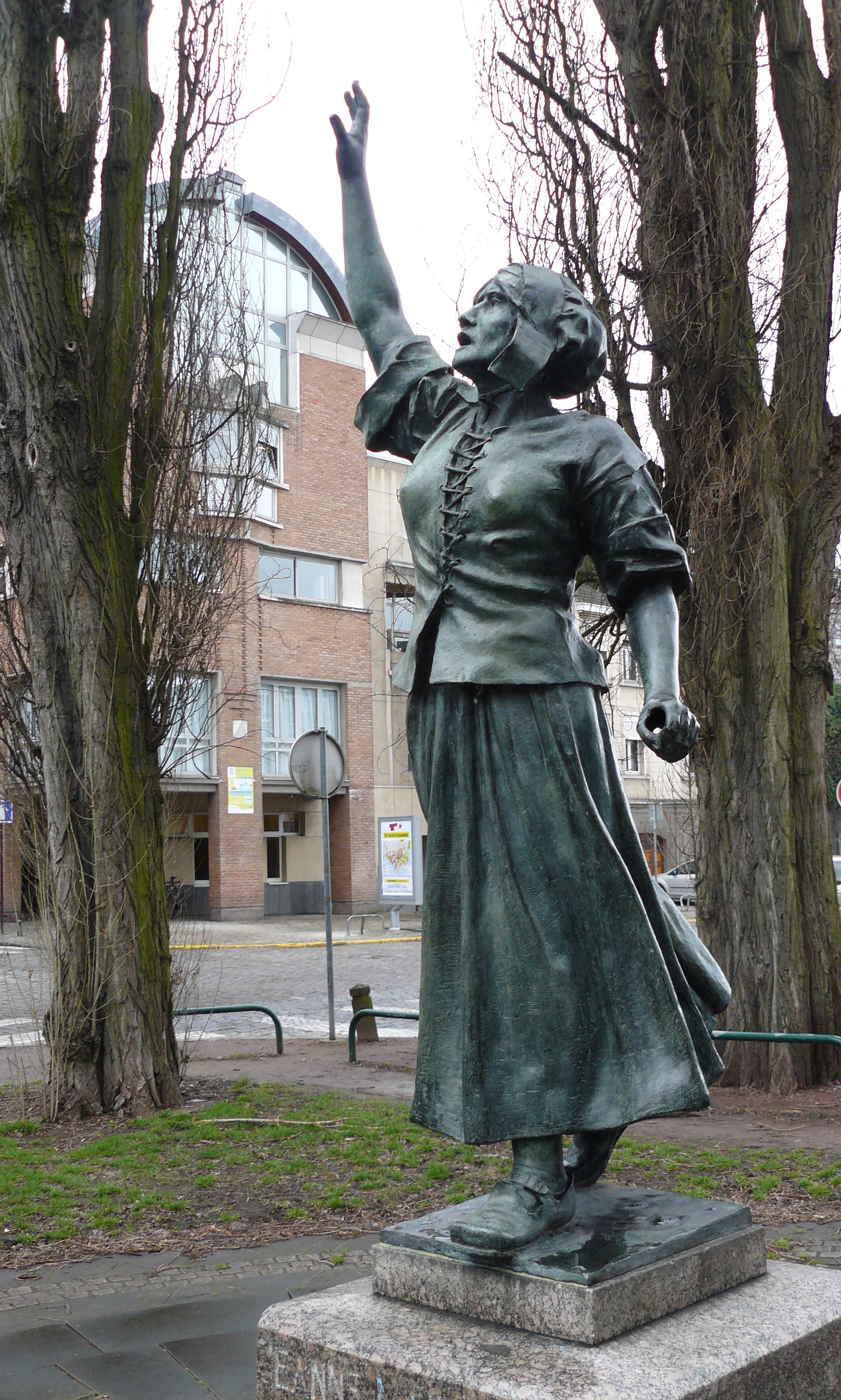
Statue of Jean Maillotte. Photograph courtesy Marie-Hélène Cingal.

== See also ==
- Hôtel Terminus
