= Marcel Maas =

- Marcel Maas in 1946

Background information
- Born: 7 May 1897; Clermont-Ferrand, France
- Died: 11 June 1950 (aged 53) Sint-Genesius-Rode, Belgium
- Genres: Classical
- Instrument: Piano

Marcel Maas (7 May 1897 – 11 June 1950) was a Dutch-Belgian pianist. He died at his home in Sint-Genesius-Rode, on 11 June 1950. His repertoire includes Bach and Scarlatti to the moderns; he was an appreciated interpreter of the solo piano music of Franck, Debussy and Ravel.

== Life ==
=== Early years ===
He was born on 7 May 1897 in Clermont-Ferrand, France, where his father, a successful Dutch operatic bass, was then based. The family soon moved to Belgium and Marcel eventually took Belgian nationality. His brother, Robert Maas was a cellist.

=== Career ===
He studied at the Royal Conservatory of Brussels with Arthur De Greef and soon began an international career. In 1933 he became a professor at the Royal Brussels Conservatoire.

During the 1930s he joined the Quator Pro Arte, created with violinist Alfred Dubois and Robert Maas. Pro Arte became one of three outstanding sonata partnerships which flourished in the 1930s, along with Adolf Busch – Rudolf Serkin and Szymon Goldberg/Lili Kraus.
