= Montigny-sur-Loing =

- Commune
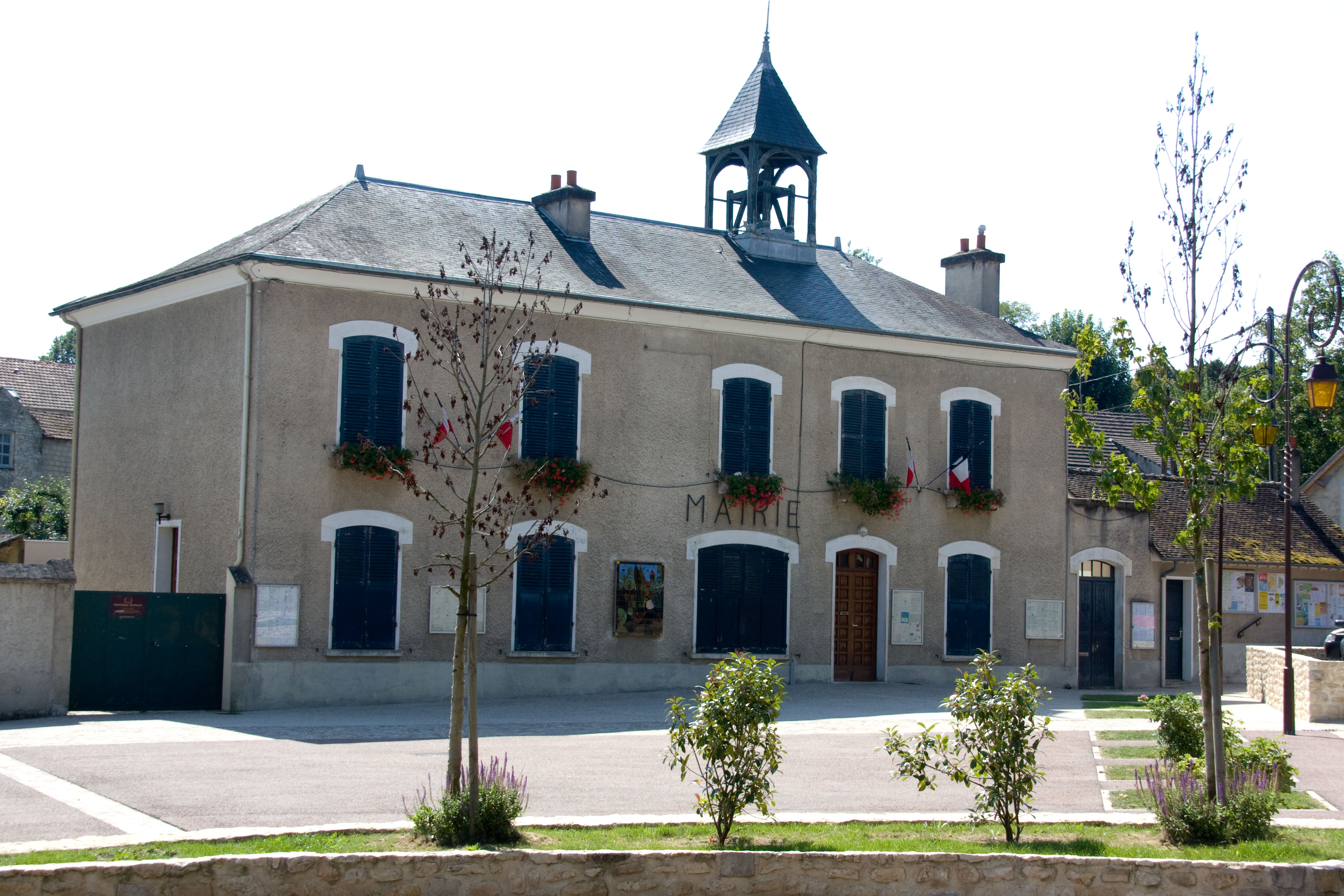
- The town hall in Montigny-sur-Loing
- Location of Montigny-sur-Loing
- Location within France Location within Île-de-France (region)
- Coordinates: 48°20′01″N 2°44′42″E
- Country: France
- Region: Île-de-France
- Department: Seine-et-Marne
- Arrondissement: Fontainebleau
- Canton: Nemours
- Intercommunality: CC Moret Seine et Loing

Government
  - Mayor (2020–2026): Sylvie Monchecourt
- Area^{1}: 9.20 km^{2} (3.55 sq mi)
- Highest elevation: 136 m (446 ft)
- Lowest elevation: 49 m (161 ft)
- Population (2023): 2,669
  - Density: 290/km^{2} (751/sq mi)
- Time zone: UTC+01:00 (CET)
  - Summer (DST): UTC+02:00 (CEST)
- INSEE/Postal code: 77312 /77690
- ^{1} French Land Register data, which excludes lakes, ponds, glaciers > 1 km^{2} (0.386 sq mi or 247 acres) and river estuaries.

Montigny-sur-Loing (French pronunciation: [mɔ̃tiɲi syʁ lwɛ̃], literally Montigny on Loing) is a commune in the Seine-et-Marne department in the Île-de-France region in north-central France. Montigny-sur-Loing station has rail connections to Montargis, Melun and Paris.

== Population ==
Historical population
Year	Pop.	±% p.a.
1968	1,889	—
1975	2,152	+1.88%
1982	2,042	−0.75%
1990	2,553	+2.83%
1999	2,796	+1.02%
2007	2,749	−0.21%
2012	2,766	+0.12%
2017	2,701	−0.47%
2023	2,669	−0.20%
Source: INSEE

Inhabitants are referred to as Montignons in French.

== Notable residents ==
- Shelley Steiner (born 1961), Canadian Olympic fencer

== In literature ==
- Andre Mariolle (the main character of Guy de Maupassant's novel Our Heart) rented a house in Montigny-sur-Loing.

== See also ==
- Communes of the Seine-et-Marne department
