= Félix-Alexandre Desruelles =

French artist (1865–1943)

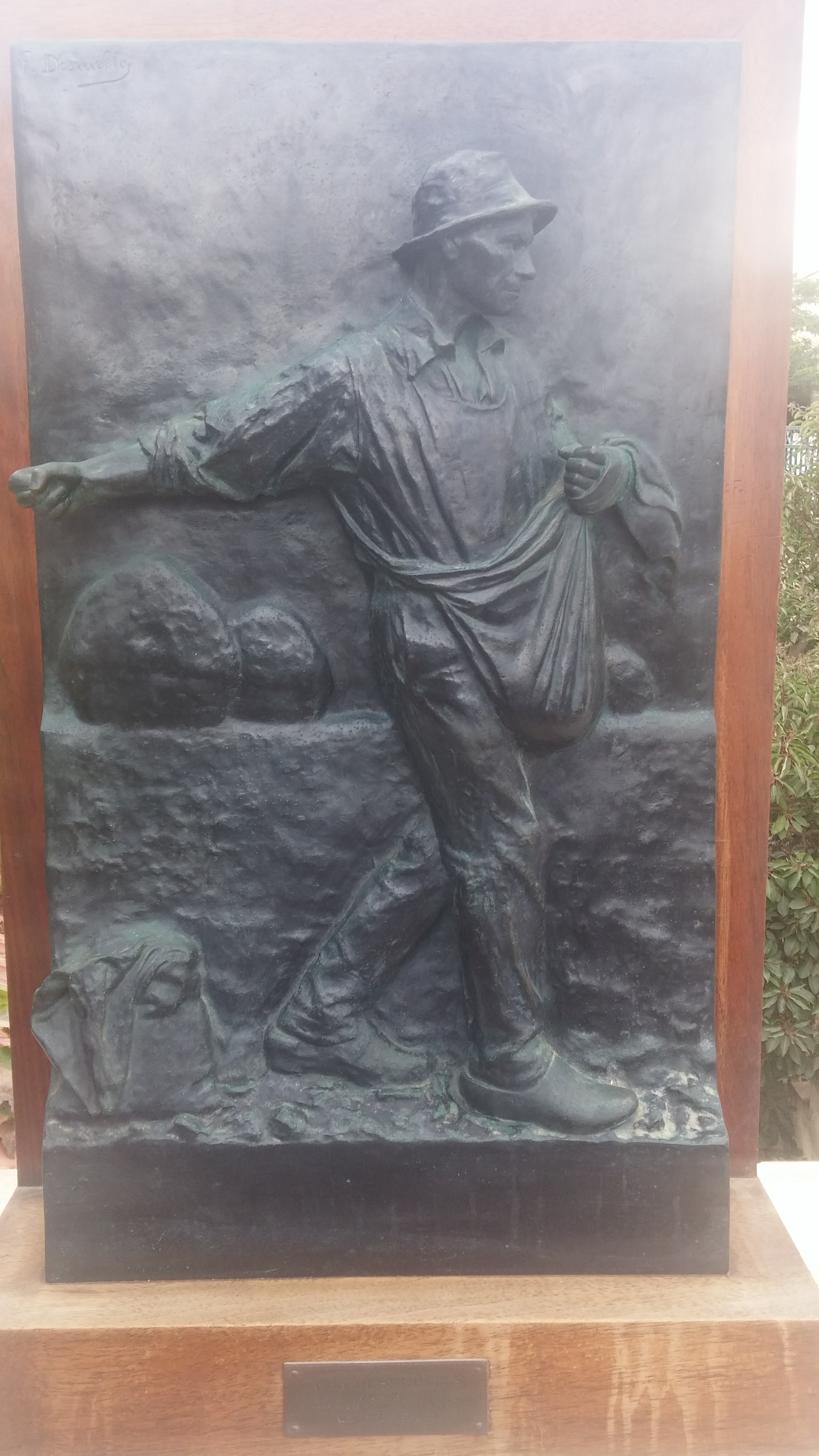

Félix-Alexandre Desruelles was a French sculptor who was born in Valenciennes in 1865. He was runner up for the Prix de Rome in 1891, won the Prix national des Salons in 1897 and a gold medal at l'Exposition Universelle in 1900. He died in La Flèche in 1943. He was a member of the Institut de France and of the Académie des Beaux-Arts.

== War memorials ==
Work	Location	Subject, notes and references
The monument aux morts at Arras	Arras	One of Desruelles best known works is the war memorial (monument aux morts) in Arras. He was also the sculptor of the monument in the square Guynemer in Dunkirk dedicated to all the Marines (Fusiliers marins) killed in the 1914-1918 war especially those of the Admiral Alexis Ronarc’h Brigade which had helped to save Dunkirk from occupation by holding the Germans on the line of the Yser in 1914. The Arras war memorial stands in the Place Foch opposite Arras railway station. The inauguration took place on 22 November 1931, the inauguration party being led by Marshal Philippe Pétain. Desruelles was the winner of a competition held in 1928 to select the sculptor. The monument comprises a central column, said to follow the design of the old temples of Mesopotamia. On the side of the column facing the railway station we have an angel, representing peace, at the top of the column, and below her a soldier. Between the two figures is the inscription "Arras a ses enfants morts pour la défense du droit". Under the angel of peace are the words "La Paix, les ailes largement déployées, debout sur le promontoire". Under the soldier is the inscription: "Le soldat français / hier soldat de Dieu / Aujourd’Hui Soldat de l’humanité / Sera toujours le soldat du droit".The right and left sides of the column bear a series of reliefs those reliefs on one side being concerned with peace and those on the other with war. Those concerning peace are a celebration of "Work"-life in the fields and in industry. At the bottom we see a tractor and the word "Travail". Moving upwards we see four farm labourers working in unison with scythes, and above a frieze of bee-hives. Above this frieze, two cows are seen being led along by a youngster and next we have two horses pulling a plough and then we see two sacks filled with flour; the fruits of all their labour. Dealing with commerce and industry there are a miner, a farrier and a farm labourer standing side by side. Above these figures we see three miners hewing coal and then have another frieze, this one featuring miners' lamps. Next we see various women at work; a linen draper and a woman attending to her baby. Finally we have a tipstaff, a sheaf of corn and a wheel with gears and at the top a further frieze of ears of corn. The other side of the column deals with war; not epic battles but the daily life of soldiers at the front. At the bottom we see a tank, and above the tank a soldier in the trenches, and then a donkey carrying a pack. A frieze of mortars then leads us to five marching soldiers. Next we have a cannon, then a sailor, an infantryman and an aviator, the three arms of the services. Above them an angel is seen sounding a trumpet with the words "Gloire à notre France Eternelle / A ceux qui sont morts pour elle". We then have a frieze featuring everyday objects. Next we have a nurse carrying a tray of medicines and a figure representing "Notre Dame de Lorette" that most important war memorial and cemetery. At the top is a bundle of rifles flanked by two croix de guerres and above them a row of torpedoes.
The monument aux morts at Auchel	Auchel Pas-de-Calais	Auchel is a former mining town situated southwest of Béthune and the monument in the rue Jean Jaurès is a work by Desruelles. The monument was inaugurated on 13 May 1928 and Desruelles wrote that his work was intended to "Flétrir la guerre, chanter la paix" (Stigmatize war, Extol peace). The monument comprises two groups. The first shows "L'humanité en deuil" (humanity in grief). Humanity covers her eyes when faced with the horrors of war; dead soldiers, towns and villages in ruins, etc. whilst the second group placed to the rear portrays an idyllic pastoral life in the mining countryside of the Auchel district after the war. The family of a miner relax in their garden. The father picks fruit from a tree, a youngster has a nap and the mother cares for the baby of the family.
The monument aux morts at Commentry	Commentry Allier	This features a farmer, meditating whilst leaning on his scythe. Whilst working in a wheat field he has come across the grave of a soldier. The inscription reads- "La ville de Commentry à ses enfants victimes de la guerre" This monument is one of those grouped as "monument aux morts pacifistes". It is located in the rue Christophe Thivrier. There is another Desruelles work in Commentry. This is a bronze bust of Isidore Thivrier and marked the 50th anniversary of the founding of what was the world's first socialist municipality in June 1882 by Isidore's father, Christophe Thivrier.
The monument aux morts at Hazebrouck	Hazebrouck Nord	In a small garden near to the parish church at Hazebrouck near Dunkerque, Desruelles' monument aux morts celebrates "Victory" but offers peace. An allegorical depiction of France in female form stands with an olive branch in one hand whilst her other hand rests on a formidable looking broad sword. The monument is dedicated to the men of Hazebrouck who lost their lives in the war. Just near to the monument is a sun-dial which is dedicated to several Hazebrouck citizens who were killed when Hazebrouck suffered from a heavy German artillery bombardment on 13 and 14 December 1917. This caused the loss of 18 people with another 26 people wounded. The dead included some priests who were at prayer in the presbytery nearby and it is recorded that the sun-dial stands on the exact spot where the priests lost their lives. The Hazebrouck monument aux morts was inaugurated on 11 November 1925 by Bishop Lemire and Maréchal Foch. There is a plaque on the wall on which the sun-dial is mounted which records the names of seven of the people who were killed in the bombardment of 13 December 1917.
Monument aux fusillés lillois.	Lille Nord	In Desruelles' composition and on the left, George Maertens, a businessman, stands with his arms crossed and looking up to the sky and next to him, again with arms crossed, is the business agent from Armentières, Ernest Deceuninck (or Deconninck). Next to him, his head lowered and arms to his side is the Belgian worker Sylvère Verhulst. Next is Eugène Jacquet, a wine merchant and secretary of the "La Ligue des Droits de l’Homme". Jacquet stands defiantly with hands in his pockets. Then on the extreme right, Desruelles adds the young student Léon Trulin. Léon lies on the ground, face down and one assumes already dead. These five were all members of the "Comité Jacquet", a resistance movement and were all shot by the Germans as spies. Trulin was shot on 8 November 1915 whilst the other four were executed on 22 September 1915. The monument stands in the Square Daubenton. Evidently in March 1915 a British aircraft had been brought down over Lille and Jacquet and his colleagues had assisted in getting the pilot repatriated. Ironically, and tragically in view of the consequences of his action, the pilot, Robert Mapplebeck flew over Lille some time later and dropped leaflets which both thanked his rescuers and taunted the German governor von Heinrich. Sadly this led to the Germans arresting 200 members of Jacquet's organisation. Many of these were deported or imprisoned and Maertens, Deceuninck, Verhulst and Jacquet shot. The monument was dynamited by the Germans when they occupied Lille in 1940 and reconstructed after the war with the help of Desruelles' widow, Germaine Desruelles.
The monument aux morts in Le Quesnoy	Le Quesnoy Nord	Commemorates the role played by the New Zealand army in liberating Le Quesnoy in November 1918 after four years of occupation. In Desruelles' composition an Angel of Victory looks on as the New Zealanders use a ladder to scale Vauban's fortified wall and start the process of liberating Le Quesnoy. See image below.
The monument aux morts at Les Lilas	Les Lilas Seine-Saint-Denis	This monument stands in the local cemetery. Inaugurated in November 1925 by Général Gouraud, the Military Governor of Paris.
Monument des Fusiliers Marins	Dunkirk Nord	This monument, erected originally in 1929, celebrates the role played by the French Marines led by Admiral Ronarc'h in resisting the German advance on the Yser in 1914 and also the role played by the Marines throughout the Great War. It consists of a central obelisk with walls on either side upon which are bas-reliefs on Salerno pink sandstone, which depict the Marines in action. At the top of the obelisk is an allegorical representation of France who stands with hands resting on the hilt of a sword. In the bas-relief to the left Desruelles depicts the "Angel of Victory" urging a group of soldiers forward, whilst the bas-relief to the left shows the French gunners in action. Along the base of the bas-reliefs are the names of some of the places where the Marines saw action- Dixmude, Steenstraete, Nieuwport, Laffaux Hailles, Grece, Serbie, Montenegro and the Dardanelles. The monument was damaged during the German occupation in the Second World War but restored by the sculptor Albert Patrisse in 1964. Patrisse was a native of Fresnes-sur-Escaut, near Valenciennes.
The "Statue Britannia"	Boulogne-sur-Mer Pas-de-Calais	The inscription on this memorial reads "Ce monument est érigé en commémoration de l’arrivée en 1914 des troupes britanniques, par un comité d’anciens combattants boulonnais et grâce à une souscription nationale. Il a été remis à la ville de Boulogne-sur-Mer et inauguré par MM. les maréchaux Lord Cavan et Pétain, le 19 juillet 1938 en présence de LL. MM. Le roi Georges VI et la reine Elisabeth" This work by Desruelles did not last for long as it was destroyed by the Germans in July 1940. There was a plaque on the memorial which read "Le jeudi 13 août 1914, les premiers britanniques débarquent à Boulogne-sur-Mer (Seaforths, 2e bataillon des Argyll and Sutherlands Highlanders, 9e lanciers, artillerie, train des équipages). Par la suite, entre 1914 et 1918 près de 5 millions de soldats traverseront la Manche It was in 1933 that a committee was formed to raise funds to pay for this memorial which raised 1,300,000 francs. The pedestal was 5 metres high and made of Boulogne marble and inserted in this were 13 blocks of granite each representing the regions of the world which had sent men to France's assistance; Ireland, India, Canada, Australia, New Zealand, South Africa, Newfoundland, etc. The statue and supporting column had a total height of 15 metres. At the top of the column was the figure of Britannia, a trident in her right hand and a shield in her left hand. She looked vigilantly towards the channel. The sculptor Stenne had started the sculptural work which was finished off by Desruelles. The monument was never rebuilt after the Second World War but there is a maquette which can be seen in the Boulogne mairie.
The monument aux morts at Suippes	Suippes Marne	In Desruelles' composition a young peasant girl carrying a sheaf of wheat stands before the grave of a French soldier, which has his helmet hanging on the cross. The grave lay in the middle of a field of wheat which was being scythed and the scything had uncovered the grave.

== Other works ==
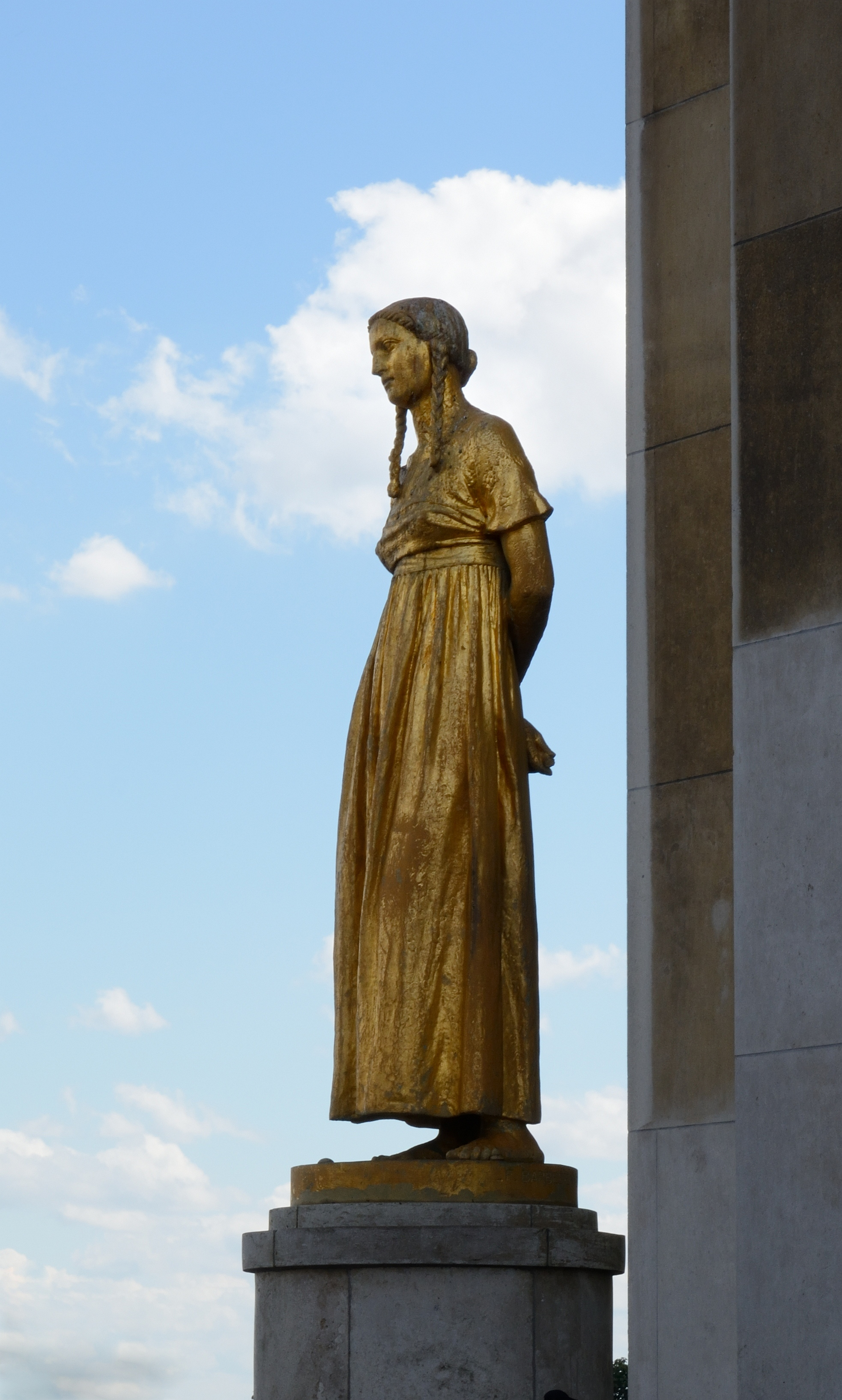
Les Fruits, Parvis des droits de l'homme, Paris

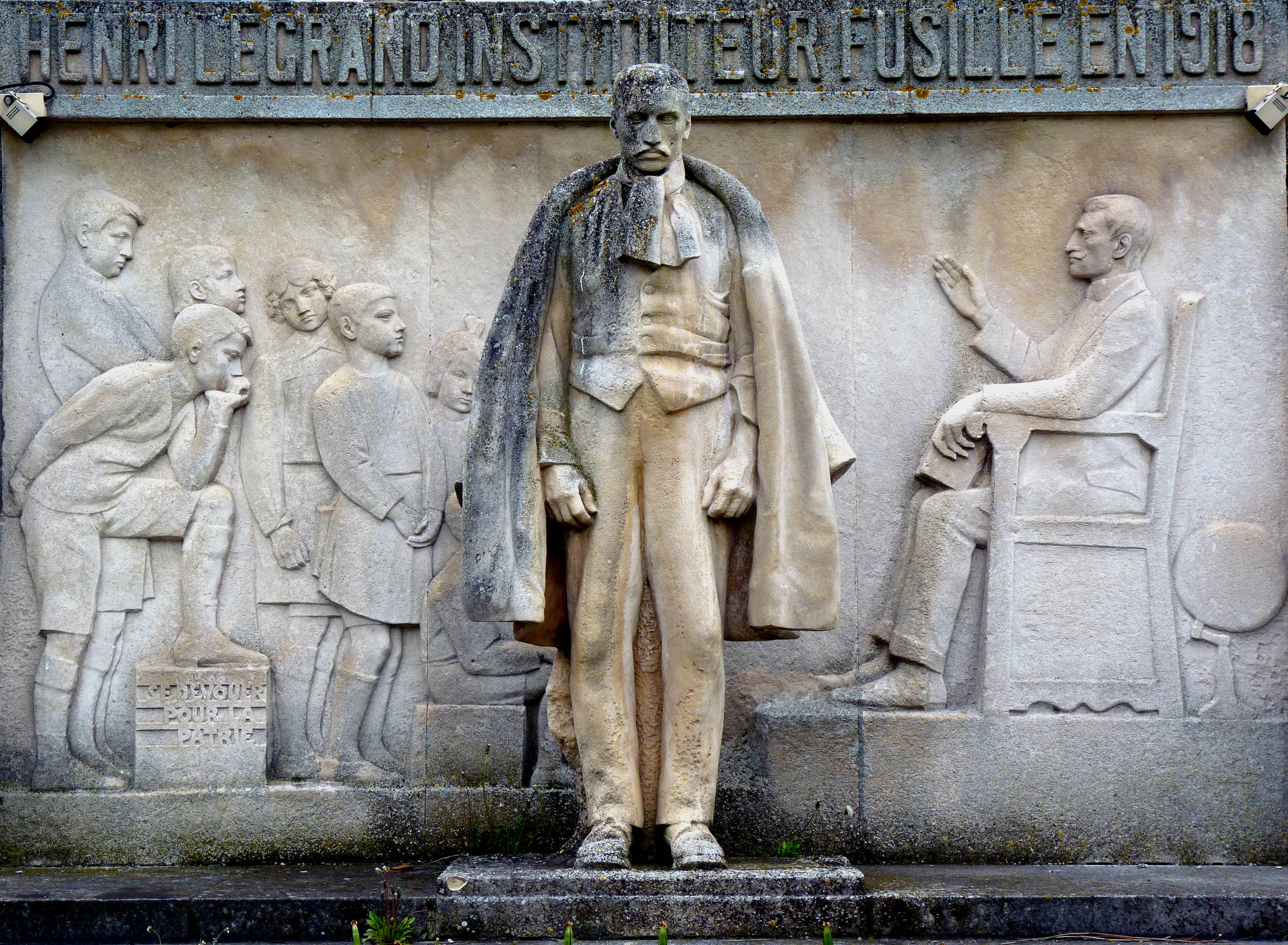
Henri Legrand monument in Valenciennes

Work	Location	Subject, notes and references
The grave of Henri Durre	Valenciennes Nord	Desruelles carried out the sculptural work on Durre's grave in the Saint-Roch cemetery in Valenciennes. Durre was a socialist deputy killed by the Germans on 23 October 1918. His name is inscribed on the monument aux morts of Palais Bourbon.
The grave of Emmanuel Dossche and Adelaïde Ythier.	Valenciennes Nord	Also in Saint-Roch cemetery, Desruelles sculpted a young woman guarding the flame of a candle on the grave of Emmanuel Dossche and Adelaïde Ythier.
Statue of Maréchal Moncey	Paris	In 1918 Desruelles executed a statue of Maréchal Moncey for the exterior of the Rohan Wing of the Louvre in Paris.
"Les fruits" " Le Semeur" – gold medal at the Universal Art Exposition in 1900 in Paris – held by private collector	Paris	This gilded bronze is one of the statues on the Esplanade of the Trocadéro (Parvis des droits de l'homme).
"Prêtre"	Lille Nord	This statue by Desruelles, a study of a standing priest, is to be found in the Palais des Beaux-Arts in Lille.
"La paix armée"	Péronne Somme	This bronze by Desruelles has been acquired by the Historial de la Grande Guerre in Péronne and is on display.
Bust of Eugène Delacroix (1798–1863) the painter	Versailles	In 1894 Desruelles executed a marble bust of Delacroix which is in the châteaux de Versailles et de Trianon at Versailles.
"Cérès"	Le Mans Sarthe	A Desruelles work acquired by the Musée de Tessé in Le Mans in 1931.
"L'Enfant a l'Oie"	Le Mans Sarthe	This small statuette was acquired by the Musée de Tessé in Le Mans in 1931.
"Maternité"	Le Mans Sarthe	A statuette entitled Maternité by Desruelles was purchased in 1931 by the Musée de Tessé in Le Mans
"Paris"	Le Mans Sarthe	Another statuette by Desruelles which the musée de Tessé acquired in 1931
"le Doryphore"	Paris	Plaster high relief by Desruelles which was his submission for the 1888 Prix de Rome. It is now held in the Beaux-arts de Paris, l'école nationale supérieure.
"La Rêverie"	Paris	This work was Desruelles' submission for the Prix de Rome in 1891. It is now held in the Beaux-arts de Paris, l'école nationale supérieure.
Pastoral Scene	Issy-les-Moulineaux Hauts-de-Seine	In the Henri Barbusse park in the rue Lasserre in Issy-les-Moulineaux there is a Desruelles sculpture of a young boy with a cow.
"Job"	Valenciennes Nord	This study of Job is held in the Musée des Beaux Arts in Valenciennes.
"Jeune fille"	Paris	Desruelles exhibited this study of a young woman at the Salon des Artistes Français in 1913. Desruelles is noted as the author of the work together with François Antoine Vizzavona(1876–1961). It is now held in the Grand Palais in Paris.
Monument Jean-Baptiste Carpeaux	Paris	This work in marble was exhibited at the Salon des Artistes Français in 1910. The work is attributed to both Desruelles and François Antoine Vizzavona. (1876–1961). It is now held in the Grand Palais in Paris.
Bust of Monsieur Gosserey	Le Mans Sarthe	This Desruelles work is held in the Musée de Tessé in Le Mans.
Bust of Madame Gosserey	Le Mans Sarthe	Another Desruelles work held by the Musée de Tessé in Le Mans.
"Bearded man in profile"	Le Mans Sarthe	A third Desruelles work in the Musée de Tessé in Le Mans.
Monument Étienne Richaud	Martigues Bouches-du-Rhône	In this Desruelles' work a bust of Richaud sits on a pedestal and a young boy appears to be writing on the pedestal. A plaque on the pedestal states "A Etienne Richaud, gouverneur de l'Indochine, inspecteur de la marine et des Colonies, mort en mer le 31 mai 1889, à bord du Calédonien, ses compatriotes et ses amis voulant honorer la mémoire de ce fils de pécheur, élevé par son mérite aux plus hautes fonctions de l'Administration française ont érigé ce monument par souscription publique" Richaud was a Governor of Indochina and a Colonial Administrator who died at sea on 31 May 1889 on board the "Calédonien".
"L'Enfant prodigue"	Valenciennes Nord	In the Parc Plumecocq is a work by Desruelles entitled "L'Enfant prodigue". Desruelles completed this in 1889.
Monument to Jean-Baptiste Carpeaux.	Valenciennes Nord	Carpeaux was one of France's great sculptors and he is celebrated in Desruelles' work "Jean-Baptiste Carpeaux, méditant" which is located in the place Carpeaux in Valenciennes. See image in gallery below.
Monument to Henri Legrand	Valenciennes Nord	Desruelles' work celebrates the life of the teacher Henri Legrand who was executed by the Germans during the 1914-1918 war. It stands in the avenue Villars and was inaugurated on 22 July 1928. Legrand had been accused of treason and espionage and of passing military secrets to the Allies by carrier pigeon. He was arrested at the school in the rue des Capucins where he taught, kept in prison for several months and then shot. Legrand stands in front of a bas-relief which shows a group of students listening to their teacher. The bas-relief carries the inscription "Se dévouer pour la Patrie" ("They devoted themselves to serving the Motherland"). The monument is located in the Avenue Villars. (See picture to the right)
Bust of Julien Déjardin	Valenciennes Nord	Desruelles completed this bust.
Monument Jean Jaurès	Dole Jura	This work stands in the Promenade du Pasquier in Dôle.
"La fontaine pastorale"	Paris	A 1925 work which stands in the square Félix Desruelles in Paris.
The monument to Jean-Baptiste Trystram	Dunkirk Nord	Originally the monument involved two pedestals, one featuring Desruelles' figure of Trystram, the other with an allegorical female in a boat by Hippolyte Lefèbvre. Both pedestals were destroyed during the Second World War and the Lefebvre piece is now in the gardens of the Musée des Beaux-Arts in Dunkirk, and Desruelles' Trystram is by the Trystram Lock in Dunkirk
Buste of Henri Ghesquière	Lille Nord	This work has a bust of Ghesquière on a pedestal and beneath a study of a woman and child. Was vandalised last year but has now been completely restored.
Bust of Maurice Rouvier	Neuilly-sur-Seine Hauts-de-Seine	In the cemetery at Neuilly sur Seine in the rue Victor Noire, Desruelles worked on the tomb of Maurice Rouvier. He executed a bronze bust of this French Minister.
Bust of the painter Le Sidaner	Whereabouts unknown	This bust was an early work by Desruelles
"Le Rieur"	Valenciennes Nord	The smiling boy appears to be testing a water fountain. This work is located in the Place Poterne. See image in gallery below.
"Pieta"	Paris	This work is held by the Musée des Années in Boulogne-Billancourt.
Le Semeur	Alon Shvut, Israel	Bronze Statue – won the gold medal at the Universal Art Exposition in Paris in the year 1900 – held by private collector.

== Notes ==
- In the 6th arrondissement of Paris, just by the Saint-Germain-des-Prés church, there is a small public park named after Desruelles, the Square Félix Desruelles. It is here that one can see "La Fontaine pastorale" – see above.
- A photograph of the 1887 work "Pastorale", a high-relief in plaster, is one of several photographs in an album of works purchased by the State from the "Service des Beaux-Arts. Salon de 1897"
