= The Forest in Winter at Sunset (painting) =

Painting by Théodore Rousseau

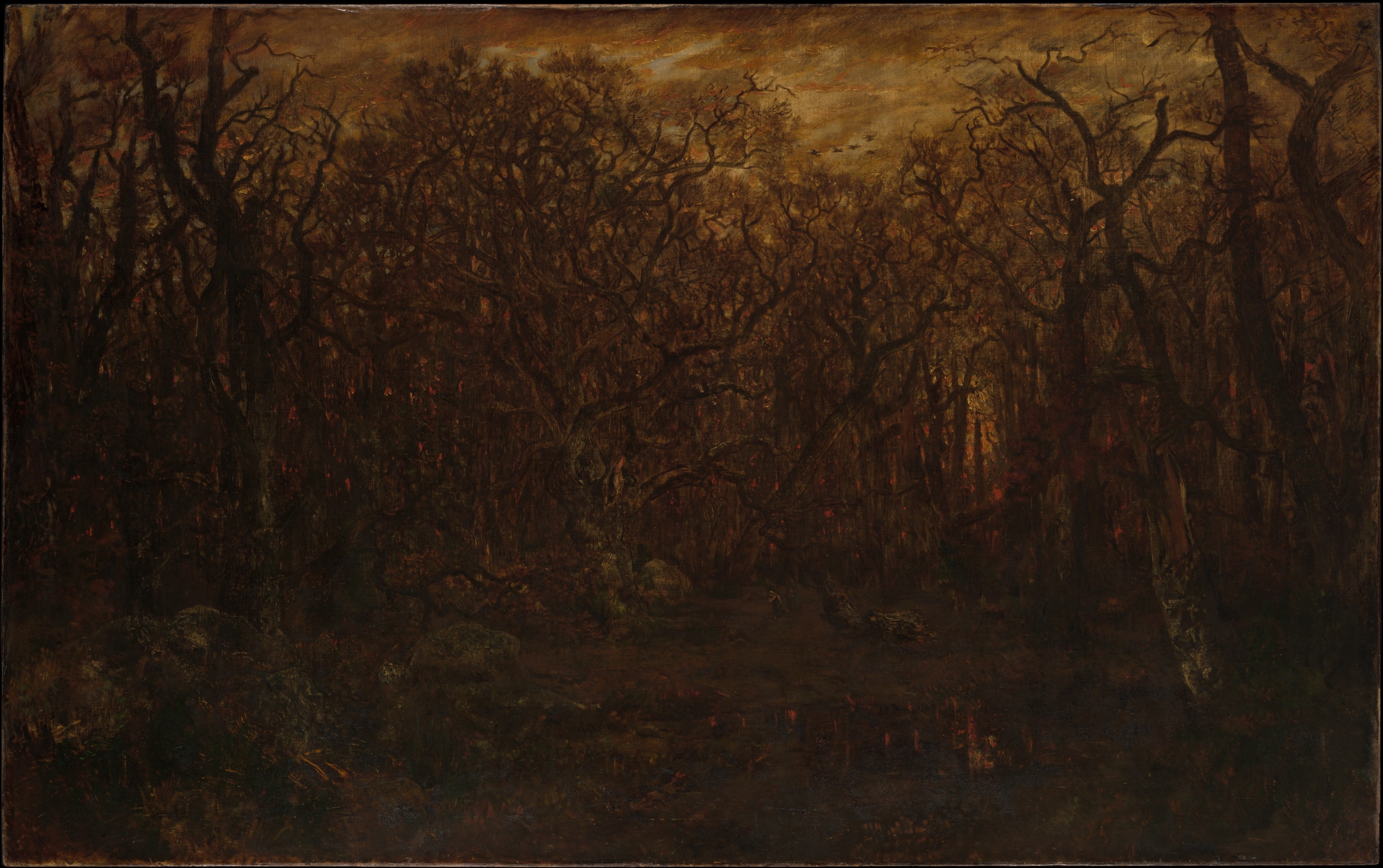
- Artist: Théodore Rousseau
- Year: 1845-1864
- Medium: Oil on canvas
- Dimensions: 162.6 cm × 260 cm (64.0 in × 100 in)
- Location: Metropolitan Museum of Art; New York

The Forest in Winter at Sunset is an oil painting by French artist Théodore Rousseau, made in 1845-1864. The painting, which depicts a forested landscape in wintertime, is currently on display at the Metropolitan Museum of Art, in New York.

== Description ==
The Forest in Winter at Sunset was painted by Théodore Rousseau between 1846 and 1867. The large painting (described by one source as "monumental") took years for the artist to complete; it was only at the urging of friends that Rousseau finished the scene. Rousseau is widely recognized for his melancholic landscape paintings, which made extensive use of a muted color palette. This reputation is reflected in Forest; set in Fontainebleau forest during a winter sunset, Rousseau's scene features a dense thicket of foliage set beneath a sallow sky. Deep colors are employed to add depth to the painting, while the defined lines of the larger trees stand out from the more-amorphous mass of smaller plants. Given that the scene is set in December 1854, every branch and is bare, further adding to the character of the painting. Two stooped peasants can be seen in the center of the painting, where they are dwarfed by the empty trees above.
