= Gibeauxiella reliqua =

Scientific classification
- Kingdom: Animalia
- Phylum: Arthropoda
- Clade: Pancrustacea
- Class: Insecta
- Order: Lepidoptera
- Family: Cosmopterigidae
- Genus: Gibeauxiella
- Species: G. reliqua

Binomial name
- Gibeauxiella reliqua (Gibeaux, 1986)

Synonyms
- Hodgesiella reliqua Gibeaux, 1986

Species of moth

Gibeauxiella reliqua is a moth in the family Cosmopterigidae. It is found in France and Madagascar. It was described from the Fontainebleau forest. The only known specimen was caught at the beginning of May on a fallen trunk of Fagus sylvatica.

The moth is about 11 mm (0.43 in).
