= Gibeauxiella bellaqueifontis =

Scientific classification
- Kingdom: Animalia
- Phylum: Arthropoda
- Clade: Pancrustacea
- Class: Insecta
- Order: Lepidoptera
- Family: Cosmopterigidae
- Genus: Gibeauxiella
- Species: G. bellaqueifontis

Binomial name
- Gibeauxiella bellaqueifontis (Gibeaux, 1986)

Synonyms
- Hodgesiella bellaqueifontis Gibeaux, 1986

Species of moth

Gibeauxiella bellaqueifontis is a moth in the family Cosmopterigidae. It is found in France. It was described from the Fontainebleau forest.

The wingspan is about 9 mm (0.35 in). It is known from only one specimen which was caught in May on Ganoderma applanatum.
