= The Forest of Fontainebleau: Morning =

Painting by Théodore Rousseau

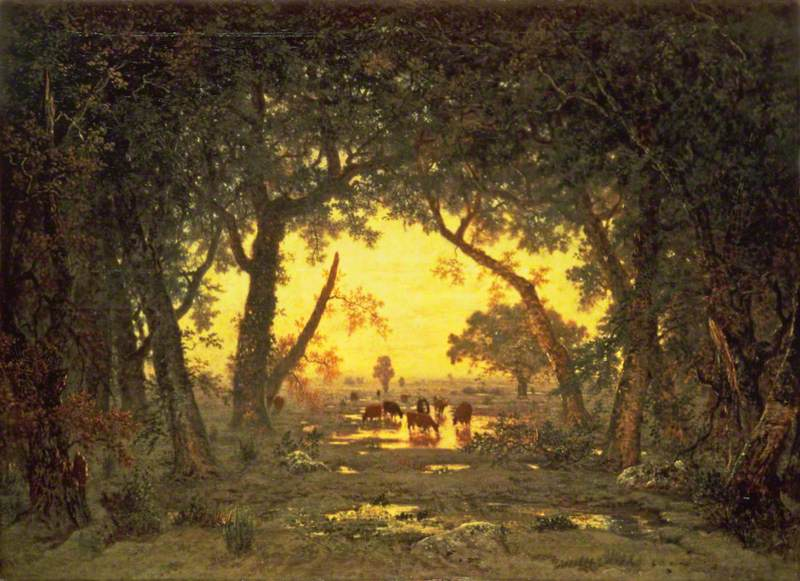
- Artist: Théodore Rousseau
- Completion date: 1849-1851
- Medium: Oil on canvas
- Dimensions: 145 cm × 179 cm (57 in × 70 in)
- Location: The Wallace Collection, London

The Forest of Fontainebleau: Morning is an oil painting by Théodore Rousseau, completed between 1849 and 1851. It was exhibited at the Paris Salon from 1850 to 1851. It is on display at the Wallace Collection, in London. It is a landscape painting that depicts the forest of Fontainebleau in the morning.
