= Gibeauxiella =

Scientific classification
- Kingdom: Animalia
- Phylum: Arthropoda
- Clade: Pancrustacea
- Class: Insecta
- Order: Lepidoptera
- Family: Cosmopterigidae
- Subfamily: Antequerinae
- Genus: Gibeauxiella; Koster & Sinev 2003

Genus of moths

Gibeauxiella is a genus of moths in the family Cosmopterigidae.

== Species ==
- Gibeauxiella bellaqueifontis (Gibeaux, 1986)
- Gibeauxiella genitrix (Meyrick, 1927)
- Gibeauxiella reliqua (Gibeaux, 1986)
