= Gibeauxiella genitrix =

Scientific classification
- Domain: Eukaryota
- Kingdom: Animalia
- Phylum: Arthropoda
- Class: Insecta
- Order: Lepidoptera
- Family: Cosmopterigidae
- Genus: Gibeauxiella
- Species: G. genitrix

Binomial name
- Gibeauxiella genitrix (Meyrick, 1927)

Synonyms
- Macrobathra genitrix Meyrick, 1927

Species of moth

Gibeauxiella genitrix is a moth in the family Cosmopterigidae. It was described by Edward Meyrick in 1927. It is found in South Africa. It belongs to the Cosmopterigidae family under the sub family, Antequerinae.
