= Claude-François Denecourt =

Inventor of modern hiking and forest tourism

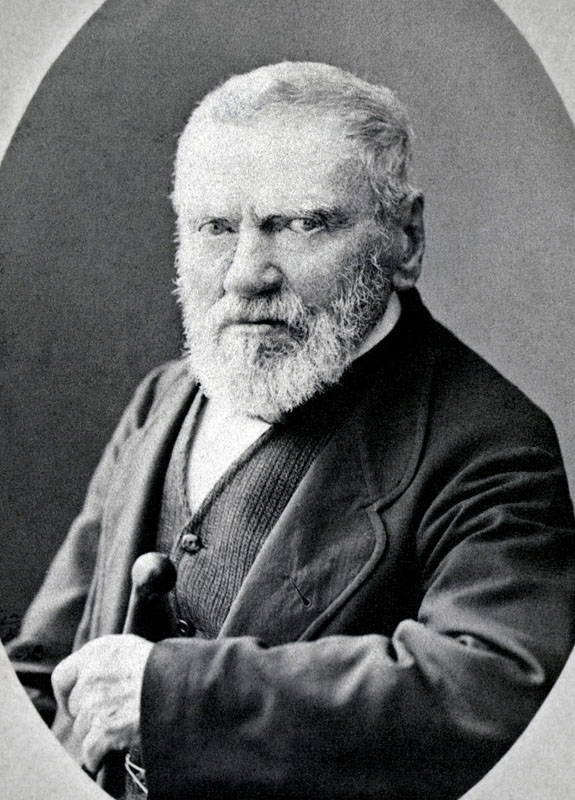
- Born: 4 December 1788; Neurey-en-Vaux, France-Comté
- Died: 25 March 1875 (aged 86); Fontainebleau, France
- Resting place: Fontainebleau cemetery
- Occupations: army veteran and tourism entrepreneur
- Known for: promoting nature tourism in the forest of Fontainebleau

Claude François Denecourt (4 December 1788 - 25 March 1875) was a veteran of the Napoleonic army who devoted much of his life to developing and promoting the riches of the forest of Fontainebleau. He is remembered as being one of the inventors of modern hiking and of nature tourism.

== Biography ==
After a childhood spent in the France-Comté region of France, Denecourt volunteered for the Napoleonic Army in 1809 and fought in the 88th line infantry regiment. He was promoted to sergeant in 1814 and demobilized in 1815. He initially worked as caretaker at the barracks at Versailles, where he amassed a ‘small fortune’ selling wine and eau de vie to the soldiers.

He was practically illiterate into adulthood, but learned to read as an adult when he became interested in politics. In 1832, he was transferred to the barracks in Fontainebleau because of concerns about his liberal and, later, republican ideas. He was dismissed for the same reason several months after his arrival in Fontainebleau.

At the age of 44, suffering from a serious depression, he discovered a passion for the Forest of Fontainebleau. He then decided to devote all his time and part of his savings to making this place known to tourists. He published forest guides, maps and prints (which were immediately successful) and began creating forest paths and markers and identifying notable trees or sites.

Denecourt showed considerable business acumen and marketing skills in his efforts to promote the forest and, indeed, he became famous. One analysis states that he became “the cicerone [that] all visiting celebrities wanted to meet.”

== Activities ==
=== Guides Denecourt ===
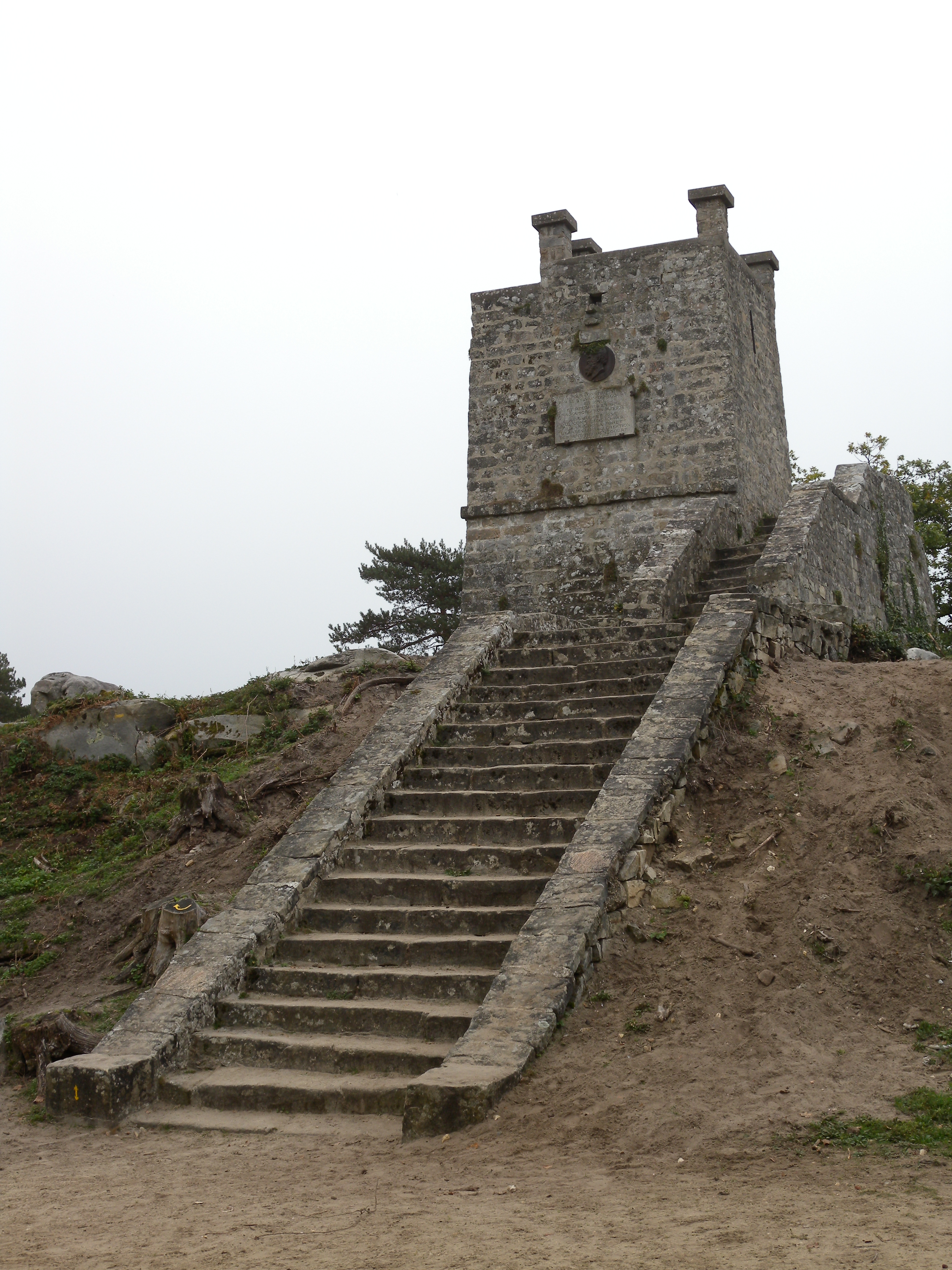
The Tour Denecourt

In August 1839, Denecourt took advantage of public interest in watching a major military maneuver at the camp of Arbonne (a village in the forest) to publish a booklet that helped visitors to locate the maneuvers in the forest. From then on, this guide would be reissued constantly until his death (11 editions between 1839 and 1848 alone), accompanied by numerous additions. His forest guides, modestly priced so as to be accessible to the masses, accompanied the growth in forest tourism in the 1840s.

Each edition contained a map, which could also be purchased separately. The map made it possible to locate the various forest attractions proposed in the guide. It also included a section on the Château de Fontainebleau, which was usually sold separately.

Though Denecourt was not a writer (he himself recognised his lack of erudition), it was his practical and concrete approach to visiting the forest – he guided excursions on request – that accounted for the success of his guide books. This success was later strengthened by the inauguration, in 1849, of the so-called ‘pleasure trains’ that made possible day trips to the forest from Paris.

=== Hiking paths ===
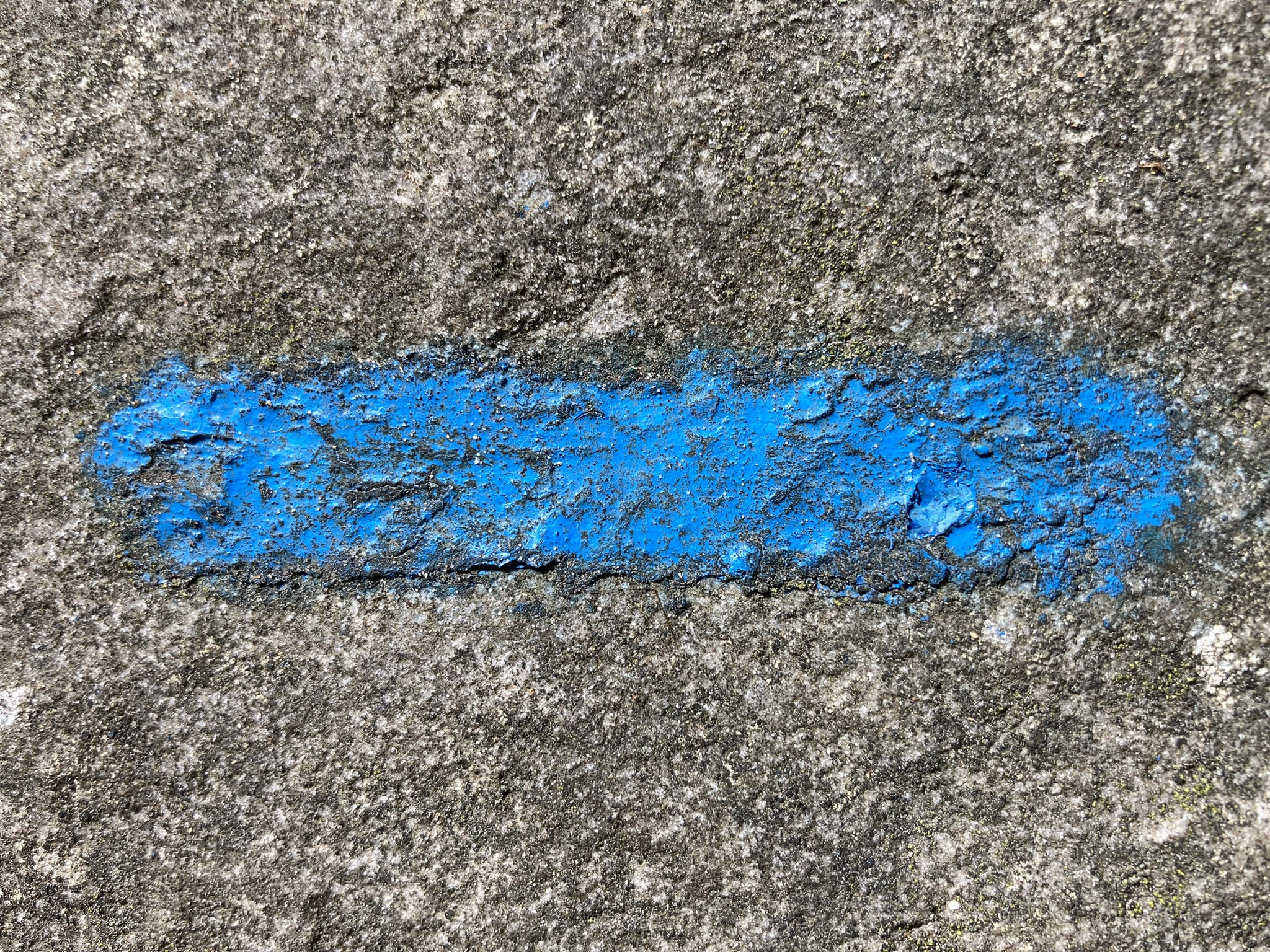
Blue trail marker for a path of the type created by Denecourt

From 1842, Denecourt was not content simply to indicate existing paths; he began to create the paths himself, with the tacit authorization of the water and forestry administration and sometimes with the help of local quarrymen and stone cutters. At the time of his death, 150 km of paths had been created and marked with blue arrows.

He also built fountains, caves and an observation tower named the "Tour de l'Empereur" when it was inaugurated in 1853 by Napoleon III (it is now called the Tour Denecourt).

Denecourt was fond of inventing romantic names for the places and prominent features of the forest: he named 600 trees and 700 rocks, sites and scenic vistas. These names, often borrowed from mythology, history or literature, referred to legends that were invented by Denecourt himself. Examples include the ’Cyclop’s Passage,’ the ‘Robbers’ Cave’ and the ‘Cave of the Oath’.

Today, these Denecourt ‘blue’ paths - a color said to recall the blue of the uniforms of the Napoleonic army in which he served - still exist and are used. They are called "Denecourt - Colinet" paths, after Charles Colinet and his wife, Maria Colinet, who continued Denecourt's work after his death.

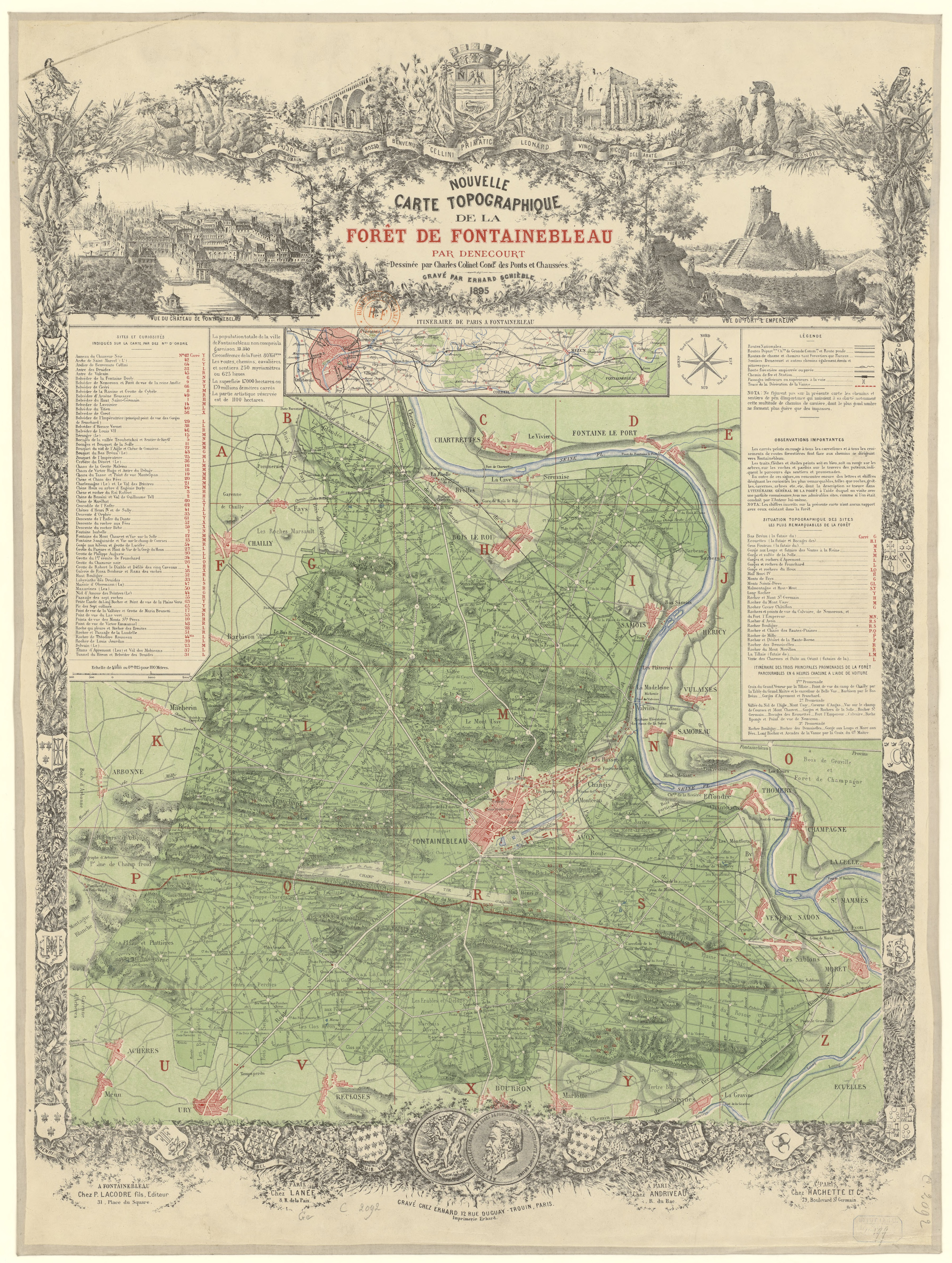
Map of the Forest of Fontainebleau, 1895, published by Charles Colinet, a disciple of Denecourt. It shows many of paths that they created.

== Homage, death and remembrances ==
Because of his work in the Fontainebleau Forest, Claude-François Denecourt is remembered as one of the pioneers of modern hiking and hiking trails. He is also credited with being one of the inventors of nature tourism for the masses.

The importance of his work was recognized during his lifetime. In 1855, 42 of the greatest French writers of the time (for example, Alphonse de Lamartine, Victor Hugo, George Sand, Alfred de Musset and Charles Baudelaire) honoured Denecourt through a collection published as 'Homage to Denecourt'. In the book, Théophile Gautier refers to him as the "Sylvain" of the forest of Fontainebleau, a title which likens him to a forest deity and which was subsequently often used when referring to him.

Denecourt died on 25 March 1875 in Fontainebleau, at the age of 86 years.

The city of Fontainebleau named a square (now called Place Napoléon-Bonaparte) and a street in his memory. In addition, the city's tourist office placed a commemorative plaque on the facade of the house where Denecourt died, at 27 rue de France. On 18 September 1932 this plaque was laid. Still visible, it says: "The denizen of forests, DENECOURT / creator of the forest trails / died in this house / 24 March 1875. "
