= Forest of Fontainebleau =

Forest in France

Coordinates: 48°24′45″N 02°39′09″E

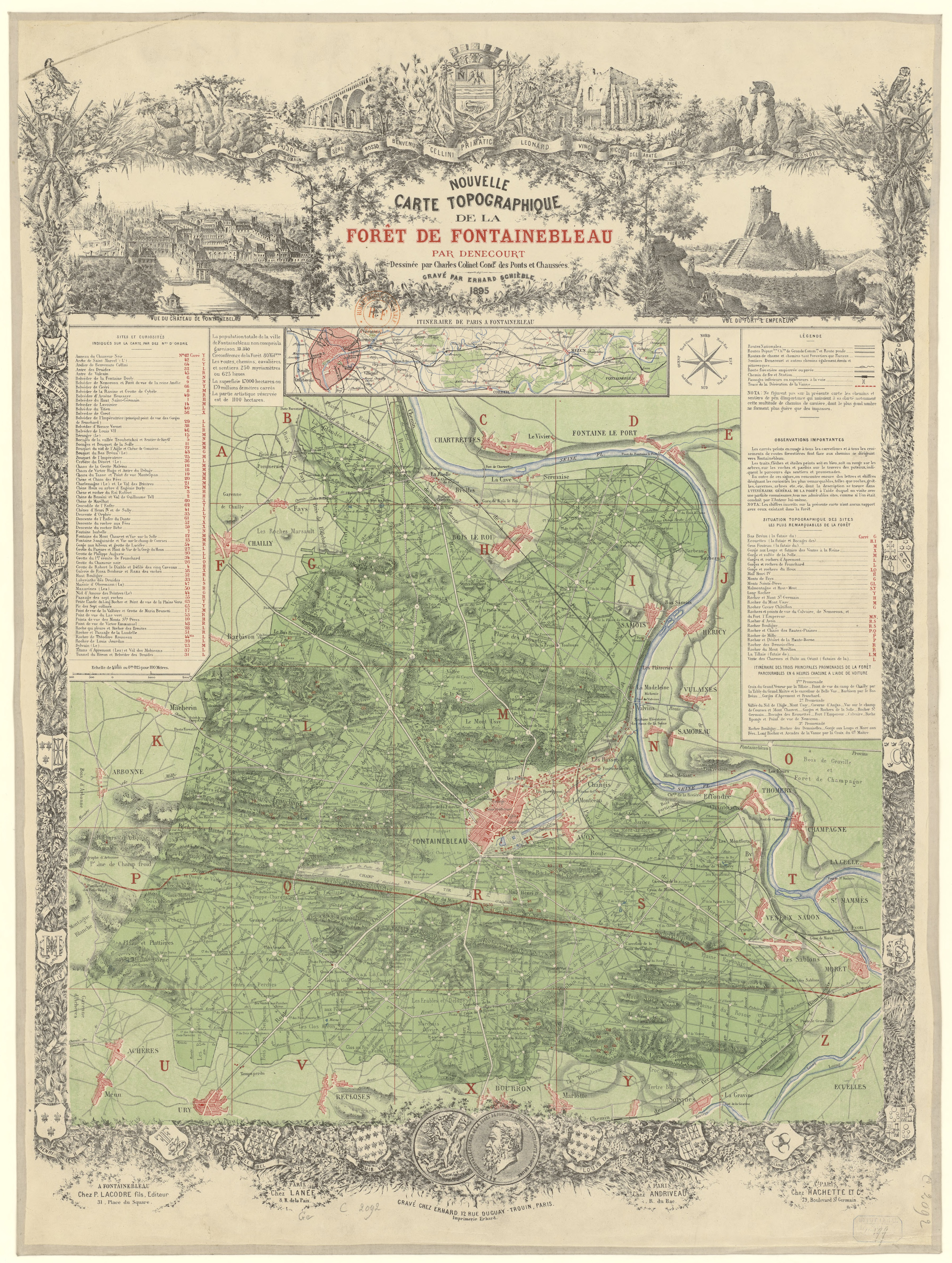
Old topographic map of the Forest of Fontainebleau, 1895

The forest of Fontainebleau (French: Forêt de Fontainebleau, or Forêt de Bière, meaning, in old French, "forest of heather") is a mixed deciduous forest lying sixty kilometres (37 mi) southeast of Paris, France. It is located primarily in the arrondissement of Fontainebleau in the southwestern part of the department of Seine-et-Marne. Most of it also lies in the canton of Fontainebleau, although parts of it extend into adjoining cantons, and even as far west as the town of Milly-la-Forêt in the neighboring department, Essonne. Several communes lie within the forest, notably the towns of Fontainebleau and Avon. The forest has an area of 250 km^{2} (97 sq mi).

== History ==
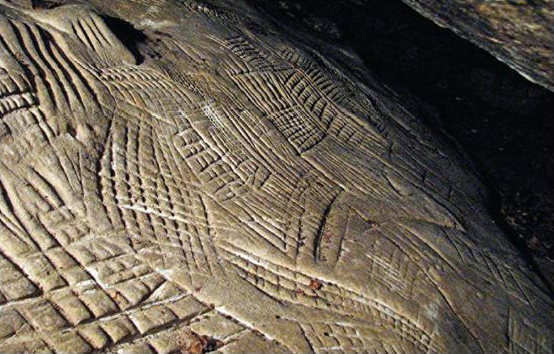
Lattice-like etchings from a cave near Boissy-aux-Cailles, Seine-et-Marne

Forty thousand years ago, nomadic populations settled around the forest. Various traces of their presence have been discovered: carved stone tools, bones of such animals as bears, elephants, rhinos, and giant stags. More than 2,000 caves with rock carvings are scattered across the forest. They are attributed to all periods between the Upper Paleolithic (around 12000 BC) and modern times. However, the majority of the carvings are from the Mesolithic (between 9000 and 5500 BC). They often take the form of geometric etchings (lattices), though some are figurative.

The fourth century BC saw the arrival of Celt and Ligurian tribes. The Celtes settled the region in the fifth century BC. A Celtic necropolis was discovered in Cannes-Écluse, along with arms and auroch horns. Near Bouray (Seine-et-Oise), a bronze Celtic statuette called the God of Bouray was dredged up, while in Bossy-aux-Cailles, a Celtic tintinnabulum was discovered.^{:89}

=== A royal domain ===
Around the year 1000, the human occupation of the forest consisted of a series of enclaves controlled by petty lords and wealthy landowners.

In 1067, Philippe I acquired the county of Gâtinais, which gave the crown control over the entire territory of the current forest. For the kings of France, the forest had several uses, including hunting and forestry, but also a military interest, as Fontainebleau was a strategic location on the road to Sens and Burgundy. In 1137, Louis VI began construction of a hunting castle consisting of a dungeon, moat, and chapel. It is during this period that the first use of the word 'Fontainebleau' appears.^{:34}

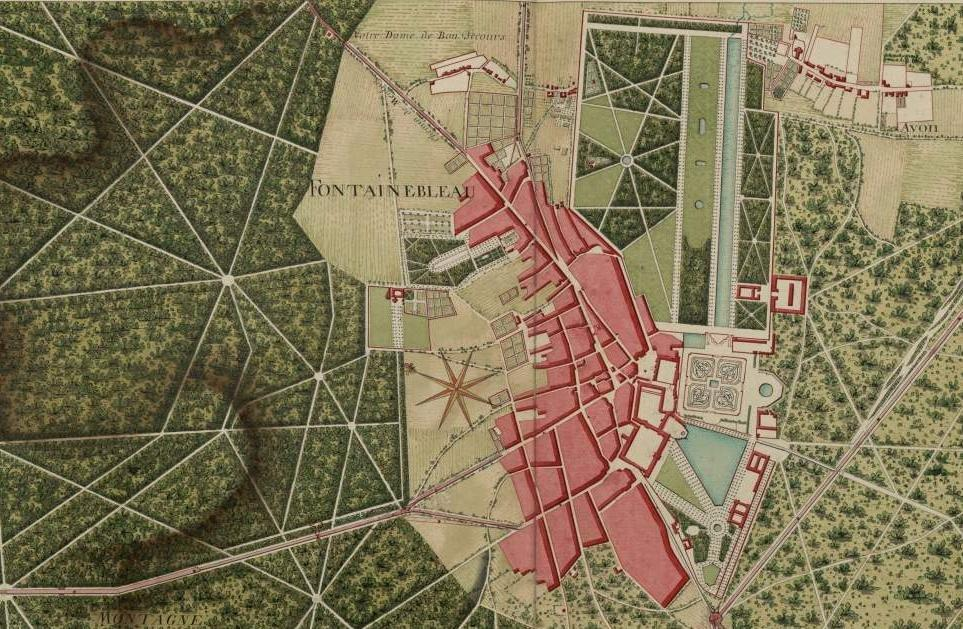
Fontainebleau and Avon in the 18th century, in Trudaine's Atlas (National Archives)

In 1400, Charles VI initiated the first reform of forest policy; that is, he ordered the complete closure of the forest area for several months in order to verify the rights and uses of each user of the forest. This exceptional procedure was repeated many times under the Ancien Régime.

The castle was rebuilt from 1527 by François I, as a base from which to hunt "the red and black beasts" which abounded in the forest. At the time, the forest covered only 13,365 hectares, but the kings of France extended it through acquisitions and forfeitures. Also under François I, the office of Grand Forestier was created. He was responsible for officers and horse guards, each having the supervision and management of a canton of the forest. It was at this time, during the 16th century, that the administration responsible for managing the forest took shape. It retained this responsibility until the French Revolution.

At the time of Louis XIV, less than 20 percent of the forest area was wooded. Jean-Baptiste Colbert launched a reform from June to September 1664 as well as a tree-planting campaign. In 1716, following the severe winter of the year 1709, 6,000 hectares were planted with deciduous trees, but this turned out to be an almost total failure. In 1750, the 90 km perimeter of the forest was delimited by 1050 boundary markers, some of which are still visible today. In 1786, Scotch pines were introduced. After the Revolution, following numerous illegal cuts and the proliferation of game due to lack of hunting, Napoleon I reformed the forestry administration and that of the castle in 1807.

=== Creation of the world's first nature reserve ===
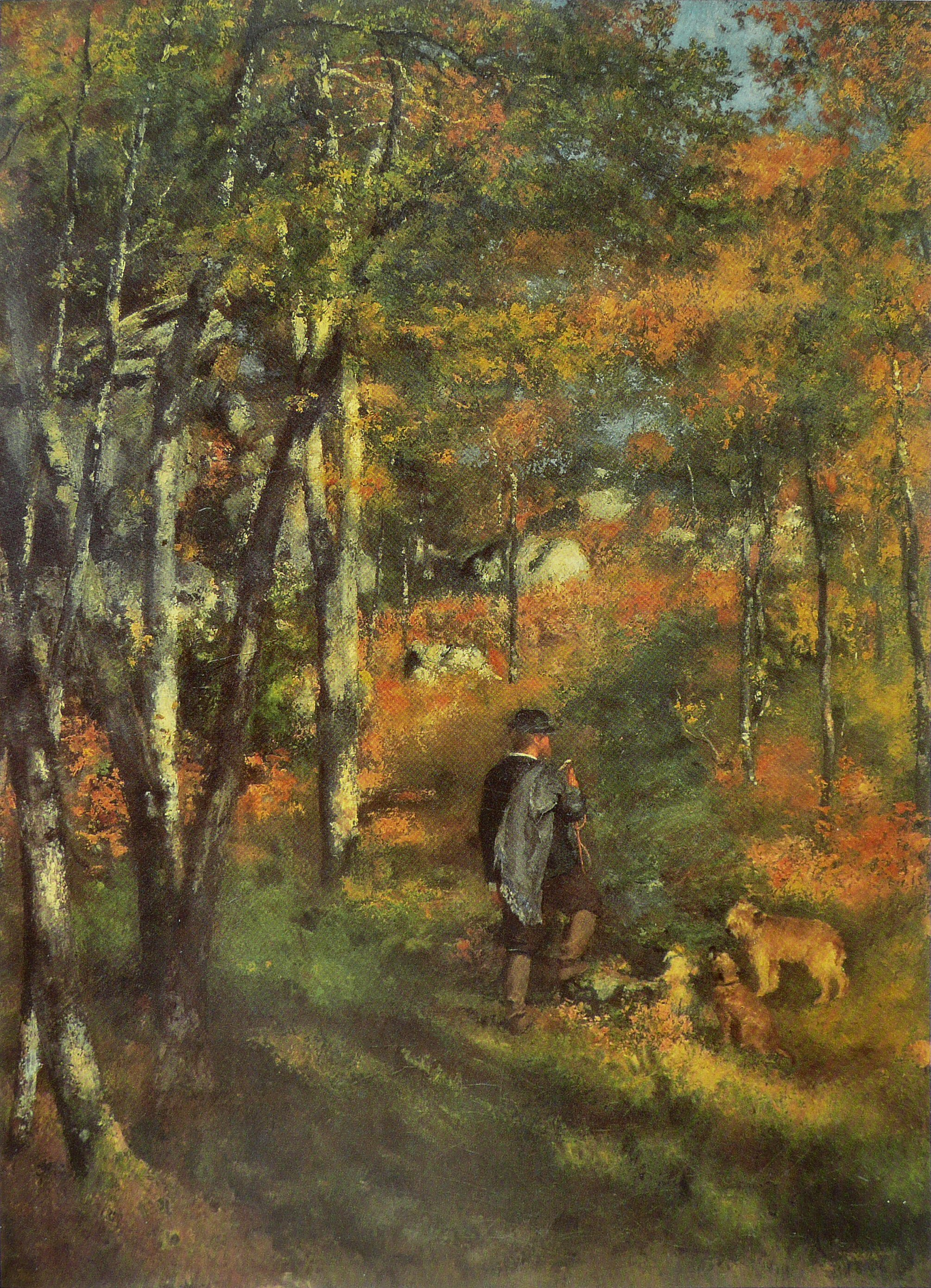
Jules Le Coeur and his dogs in the forest of Fontainebleau, Pierre-Auguste Renoir, 1866

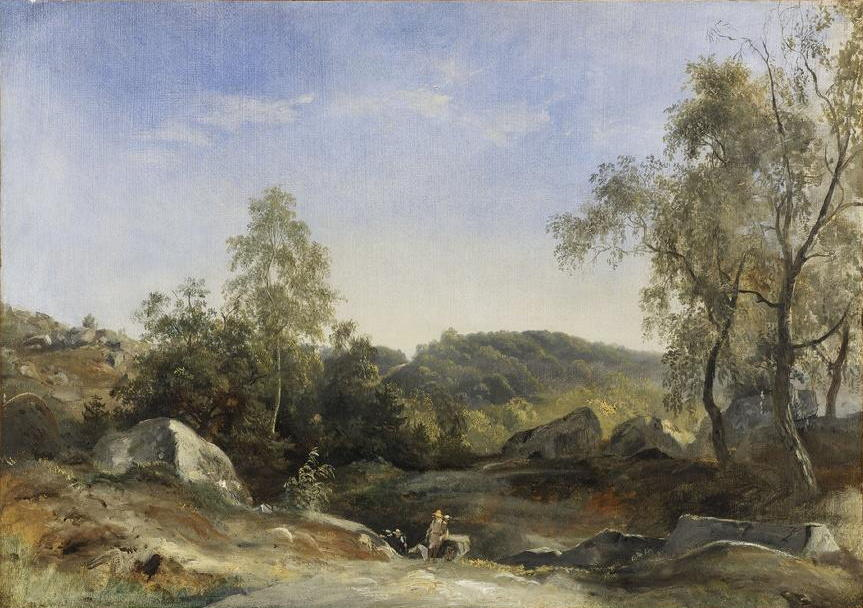
Painters at Rest, Fontainebleau, Xavier Leprince, c. 1824

In 1830, the planting of another 6,000 hectares of pine provoked the anger of artists who came to seek inspiration in the forest.

The Forest of Fontainebleau is famous worldwide for having inspired 19th-century artists, including painters of the Barbizon School and the Impressionists. The Barbizon painters, led by Théodore Rousseau and including Charles-François Daubigny, Jules Dupré, Édouard Manet, Edgar Degas, Constant Troyon, Charles Jacque, and Narcisse Virgilio Díaz, militated against the planting of softwoods which had been carried out at a pace of several hundred hectares per year since 1830. They objected on the grounds that the plantings distorted the landscapes. The artists also opposed the planned regeneration cuts in old forests in 1837 and founded the Society of Friends of the Forest of Fontainebleau to protect it.

In 1839, Claude-François Denecourt published his first forest guide and laid out the first paths in 1842. From 1849, the railway arrived in Fontainebleau, which enabled Parisians to visit Fontainebleau on day trips.^{:65} This relatively easy access helped to create public support for the protection of the forest.

La Mare aux Fees- in Fontainebleau - Alphonse Asselbergs - Groeningemuseum Brugge c. 1876

At the request of the painters of the Barbizon School, hardwood cuts were suspended in certain cantons appreciated by artists. In 1853, "nature sanctuaries" covering over 624 hectares of old forests and rocky areas (Bas Bréau, Cuvier Châtillon, Franchard, Apremont, La Solle, Mont Chauvet) were withdrawn from wood harvesting. For the first time in France, concern for “the protection of nature” became one of the objectives of forest management. By the imperial decree of April 13, 1861, the “artistic reserve” was increased to 1,094 hectares and finally to 1,693 hectares from 1892 to 1904. The director general of forests, Henri Faré, explained that the setting aside of 1,600 hectares was tantamount to losing an income of 300,000 gold francs. However, the Forest of Fontainebleau thus became the first nature reserve in the world.

== Geology ==
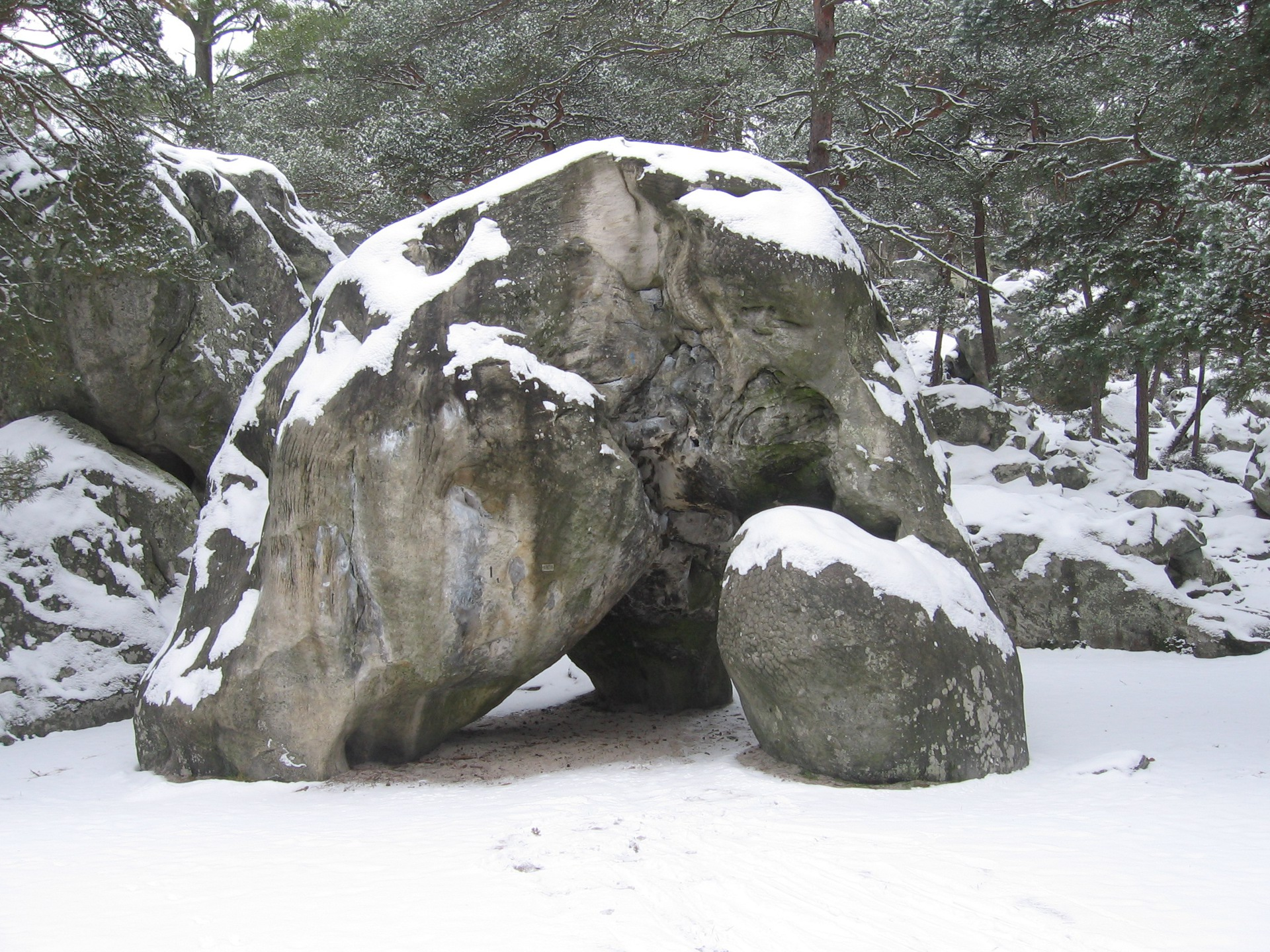
The elephant rock, near the village of Larchant

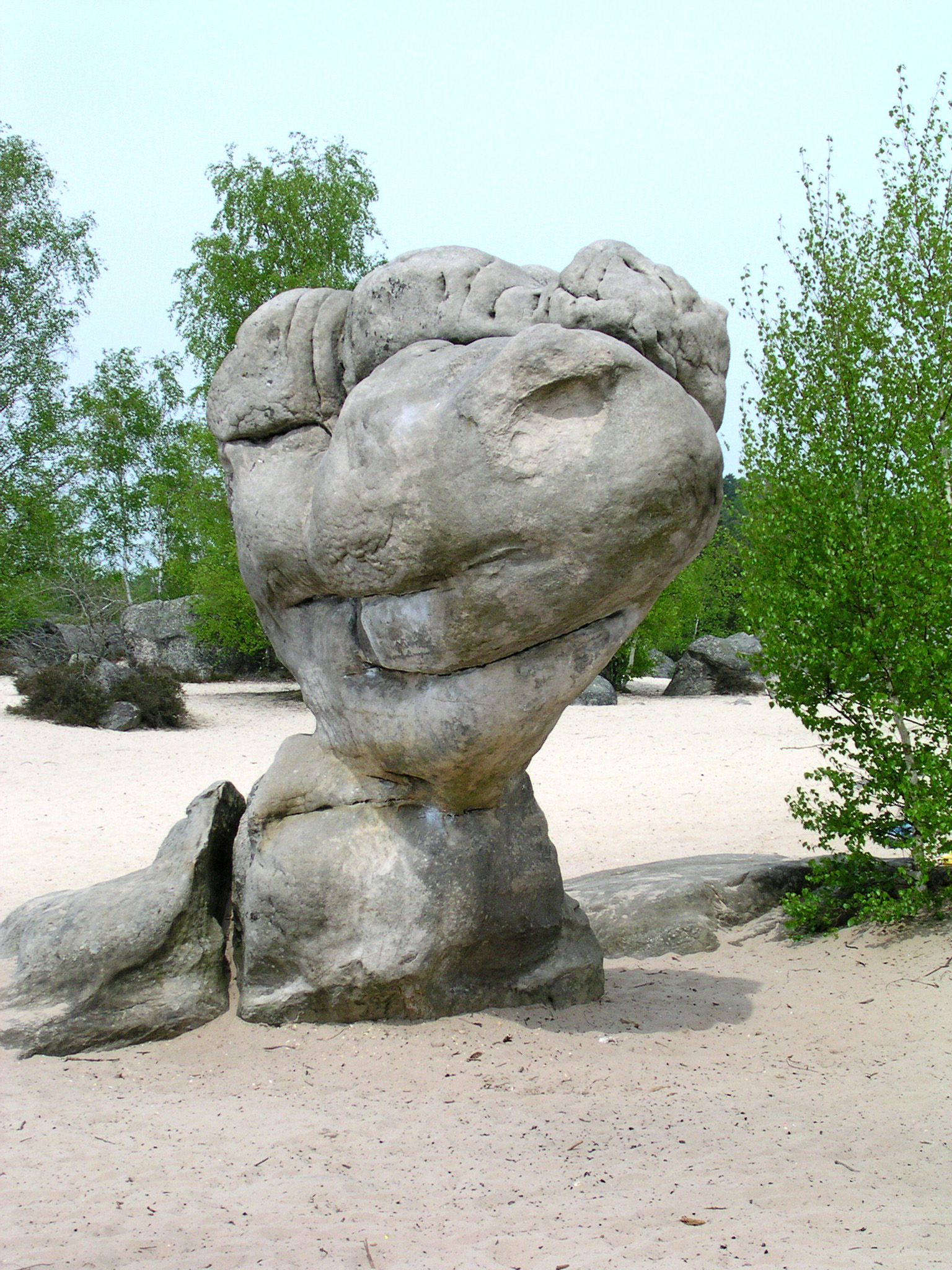
The mushroom rock, near the village of Noisy-sur-École

Thirty-five million years ago, during the Oligocene age, the area now occupied by the Fontainebleau forest was a sea that deposited sediments of fine, white sand about fifty meters thick. This sand is one of the purest in the world and is used for glassware (Murano glass in Venice) and for optical fiber.

The sand later formed the large banks of sandstone boulders – consisting of grains of quartz cemented by a silica gel – that characterise the current landscape of the forest. The boulders often have surprising shapes reminiscent of animals or objects, and they are favored by bouldering enthusiasts.

The rocks occupy an area of nearly 4,000 hectares and form long banks of almost parallel boulders oriented East South-East, West North-West, and separated by open valleys at both ends.

The forest floor contains up to 98% sand and is therefore very permeable. As a result, nowhere in the forest, except on the eastern slope between Veneux-Nadon and Samois-sur-Seine, are there any permanent sources of water. The ponds result from the capture of rainwater in depressions on the rocky plateaus, except in the vicinity of the pond at Les Evées, where clay predominates.

== Fauna, flora, and funga ==
The most common trees in the forest are: oak (44%), Scots pine (40%), and European beech (10%). Three thousand species of mushrooms have been discovered. The forest is also home to approximately seven thousand animal species, five thousand of which are insects.

=== Flowers ===
- Tor-grass (Brachypodium pinnatum)
- Service tree of Fontainebleau (Sorbus latifolia), which is under national protection
- Snowy mespilus (Amelanchier ovalis), under national protection
- Common juniper (Juniperus communis)
- Orchids
  - Violet limodore (Limodorum abortivum)
  - Red helleborine (Cephalanthera rubra), under national protection
- Meadow rue (Thalictrum minus), under national protection
- Peach-leaved bellflower (Campanula persicifolia)
- Wild madder (Rubia peregrina)
- Burnet rose (Rosa pimpinellifolia)
- Cranesbill (Geranium sanguineum)
- Vincetoxicum (Vincetoxicum hirundinaria)
- Red feather clover (Trifolium rubens), under national protection

=== Birds ===
- Great spotted woodpecker (Dendrocopos major)
- Lesser spotted woodpecker (Dendrocopos minor)
- Great tit (Parus major)
- Blue tit (Parus caeruleus)
- Chiffchaff (Phylloscopus collybita)
- Willow warbler (Phylloscopus trochilus)
- Bonelli's warbler (Phylloscopus bonelli)
- Blackcap (Sylvia atricapilla)

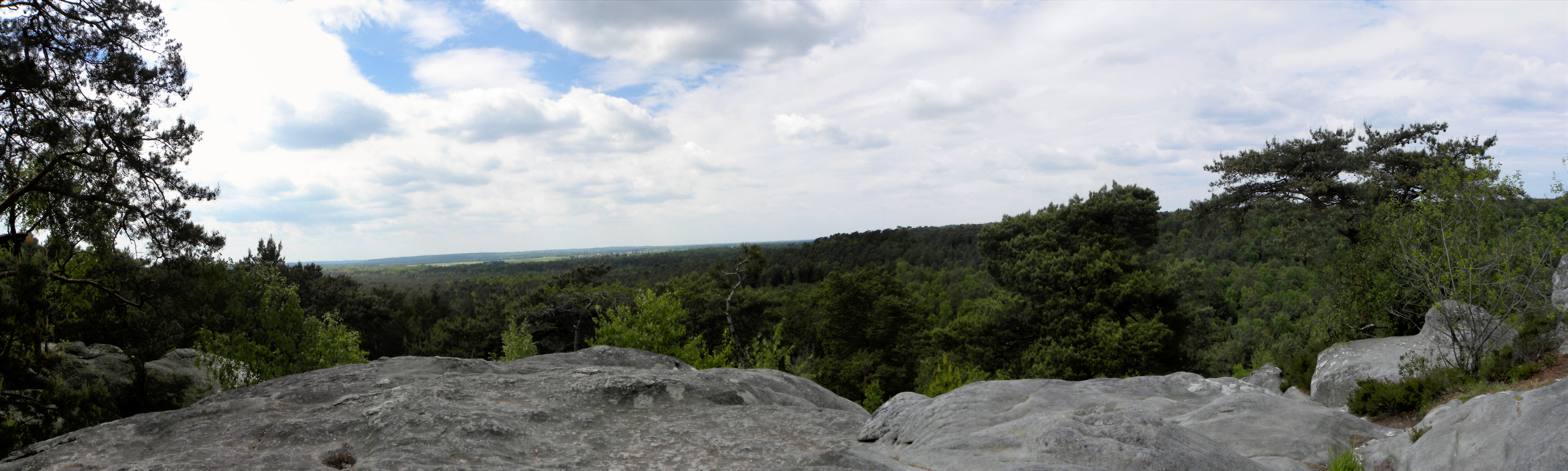
View of the Gorges de Franchard in the Forest of Fontainebleau

== Fictional and media depictions ==
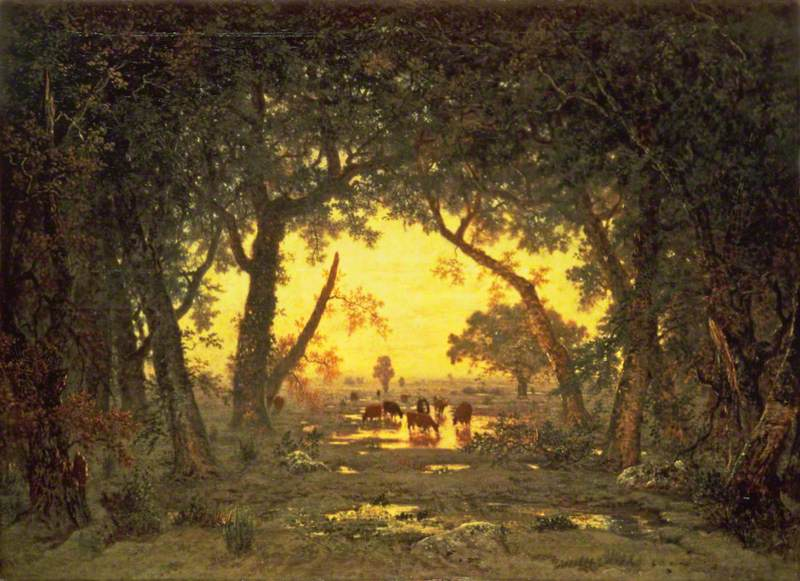
The Forest of Fontainebleau: Morning, Théodore Rousseau, c. 1850

- The painters of the Barbizon School found the forest a convenient location for their unadorned, realist depictions of nature.
  - Works by Théodore Rousseau depicting the forest include The Forest of Fontainebleau: Morning
- The forest is the main location of the trilogy Les Fourmis by Bernard Werber.
- In the 1905 novel The Scarlet Pimpernel by Baroness Orczy, Sir Percy and Margeurite St Just wander in this forest during the happy period of their courtship.
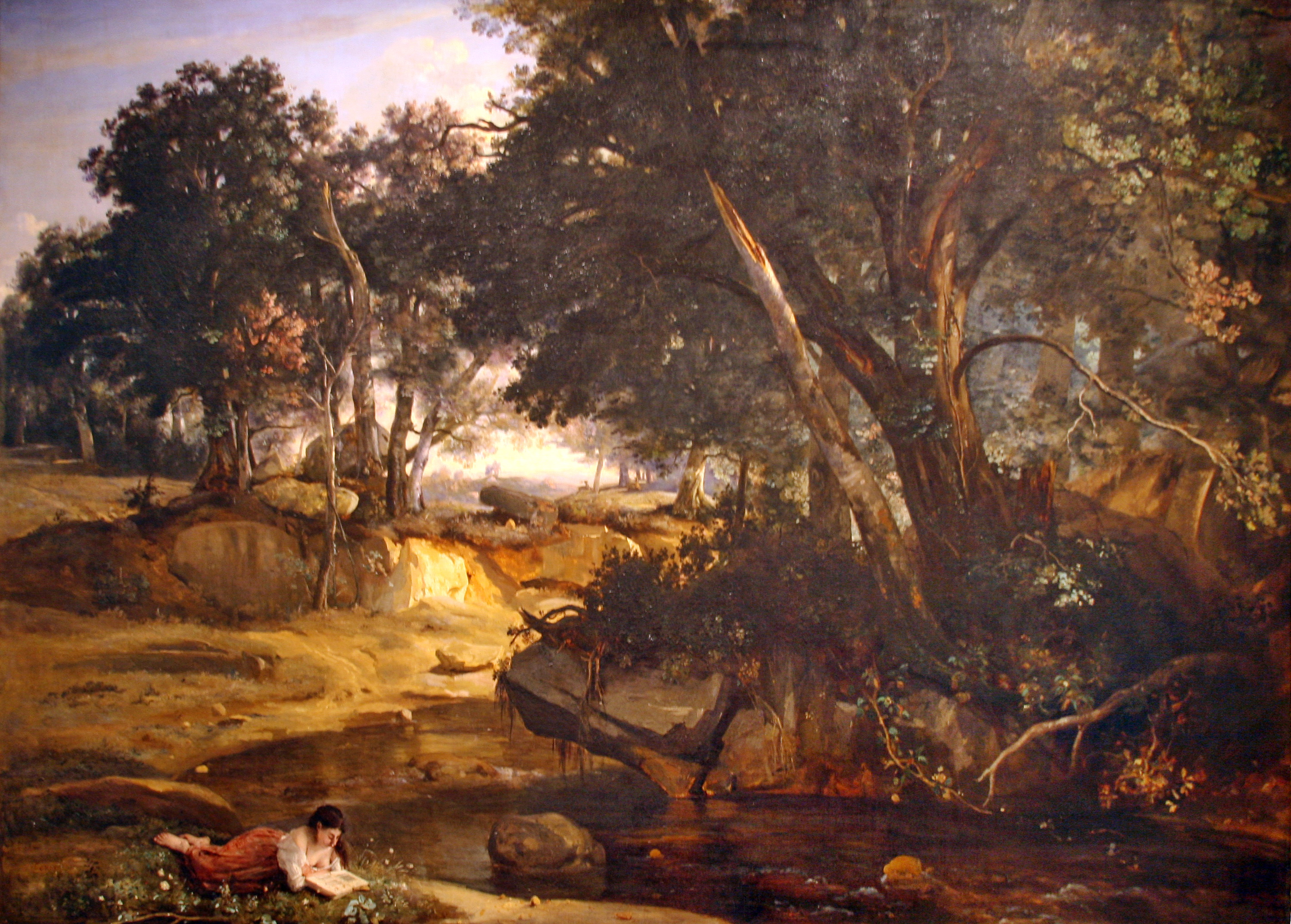
- The Forest of Fontainebleau, Jean-Baptiste-Camille Corot, c. 1830
  Act I (the prologue in the Italian version) of Verdi's opera, Don Carlos, is set in the forest of Fontainebleau.
- A scene in the 1852 play The Corsican Brothers, where a duel takes place, is set in the forest of Fontainebleau.
- Chapter 6 of the film serial Les Vampires takes place in Fontainebleau Forest.
- The map "Castle Rock" in the game Alliance of Valiant Arms takes place in the Fontainebleau Forest.
- The Santalune Forest location in Pokémon X and Y is based loosely on Fontainebleau Forest.
- DC's Legends of Tomorrow (Season 2, episode 2) battle an enhanced Baron Krieger and several Nazis after the Waverider lands in the Fontainebleau Forest.
- Louis Malle's autobiographical 1987 film, Au Revoir Les Enfants, was filmed and set in and around Fontainebleau.

== Subzones ==
=== Jean de Paris ===
The hills of Jean de Paris are part of the forest "known for its stark plateaus and rough terrain". It was a popular theme for painters and photographers of the Barbizon School.

== See also ==
- Fontainebleau rock climbing
- Bourron-Marlotte
- Larchant
- Courances
- Prehistoric rock engravings of the Fontainebleau Forest
- French forestry Ordinance of 1669
- Fontainebleau et du Gatinais
