= Tucson Modernism Week =

Annual festival

- Location: Tucson, Arizona
- Website: http://www.tucsonmod.com/

Tucson Modernism Week is an annual cultural festival and celebration organized by the Tucson Historic Preservation Foundation held in October - November which highlights Southern Arizona's unique and distinct mid-20th century architecture and design heritage. Established in 2012 the programming includes tours, lectures, films, publications, and special events. The event draws national and international speakers and participants. Tucson Modernism Week produces an annual magazine featuring original scholarship and content highlighting the contributions of 20th-century designers, architects, and thought leaders. The events and programming primary focus on Tucson and greater Pima County which is home to a significant collection of mid-twentieth century buildings by noted architects including Judith Chafee, Arthur T. Brown, Bernard J. Friedman, William Kirby Lockard, William Wilde, Sylvia Wilde, Taro Akutagawa, Tom Gist, Bob Swaim, Nicholas Sakellar, and others.

During the Covid-19 pandemic, programing was offered entirely online with virtual tours, lectures and other innovative programing.
