= Demion Clinco =

American politician

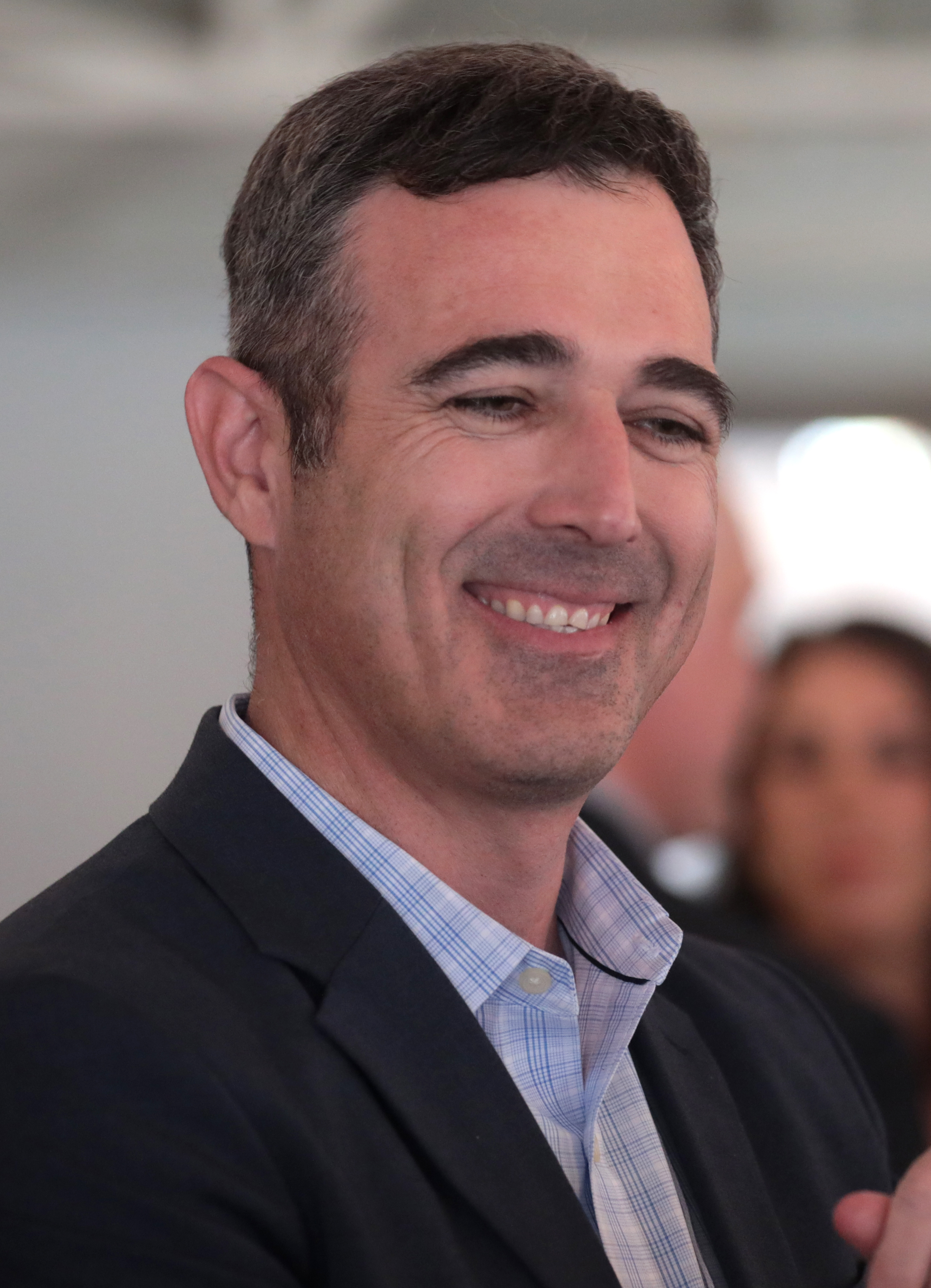
- Demion Clinco

Member of the Arizona House of Representatives from the 2nd district
- In office February 2014 – January 2015 Serving with Rosanna Gabaldón
- Preceded by: Andrea Dalessandro
- Succeeded by: J. Christopher Ackerley

Personal details
- Party: Democratic
- Education: Occidental College (BA)

Demion Clinco is an American politician, historic preservationist, philanthropist, and business leader from the state of Arizona. Clinco's social innovation included reestablishing the Tucson Historic Preservation Foundation in 2008 and launching Tucson Modernism Week in 2012 and working in the higher-education sector. A member of the Democratic Party, Clinco served in the Arizona House of Representatives, as a member for the second district until 2015. In December 2015 Clinco was appointed to the Governing Board of Pima Community College. Clinco was elected in 2016 to serve a full term and in January 2018 was elected chairman of the college's Governing Board. Under Clinco's leadership the college initiated large-scale bond projects focusing on workforce development and career technical education. During this period the college underwent a significant educational and physical transformation with the construction of major buildings including Centers of Excellence in applied technology, advanced manufacturing, automotive, aviation, and allied health. In 2019 Clinco relaunched and led the reorganization of the Arizona Association of Community College Trustees serving as the president. Clinco has served on numerous local, statewide, national and international boards.

== Education ==
Clinco attended Occidental College in Los Angeles, graduating Cum Laude with a B.A. in Art History. In 2004, Clinco moved to Europe and completed postgraduate work at Istituto Marangoni in Milan, Italy.

== Career ==
Clinco returned to Arizona from Europe and worked for the DeGrazia Foundation art museum DeGrazia Gallery in the Sun Historic District . before accepting a leadership position with Catalina In-Home Services a healthcare company founded in 1981 by his mother Judy Clinco. Clinco was appointed to the Tucson-Pima County Historical Commission by Tucson Mayor Bob Walkup in 2007. In 2008 Clinco revived and relaunched the Tucson Historic Preservation Foundation. Serving as board president. Under his direction, the organization led the efforts to save Tucson's neon signs, produce major annual cultural events, purchased and restore significant historic properties, and took on public policy initiatives leading to changes in local law. When Linda J. Lopez, a member of the Arizona Senate, resigned in 2014, Clinco was a finalist for the position. Andrea Dalessandro, a member of the Arizona House of Representatives, was selected instead. Clinco was appointed to Dalessandro's former seat in the state House. During his tenure in the Arizona State House Clinco was the only openly LGBT member. Clinco lost his reelection bid for a full term, losing to Republican John Ackerley. In the legislature, Clinco fought SB1062, a discriminatory bill targeting the LGBTQ+ community, worked to advance economic development legislation, and advanced a state historic tax credit program. He served on the House Financial Institutions and Government committees and Joint Legislative Audit Committee.

In 2015 Clinco was appointed to the Governing Board of Pima Community College and was elected to a full term in 2017. Clinco was voted vice-chair of the board in 2018, chairman of the board in 2019 until 2022, and then again assumed the role of vice-chair. During Clinco's tenure on the board and in executive leadership the college underwent major physical and programmatic transformation. The college received full accreditation from the Higher Learning Commission, made significant budget cuts, passed a multi million bond program to build innovative centers of excellence in workforce training aligned with Arizona industry needs, and received numerous national awards and recognitions for innovations including a half dozen nominations for Bellwether Awards from the Bellwether College Consortium. Clinco successfully championed legislation favorable to the college, obtained significant state project funding and supported a voter initiative to expand the college expenditure limit. In 2021 Clinco received the Trustee Leadership Award from the National Association of Community College Trustees and received an award of recognition from fellow board members in 2022.

Clinco re-established the Tucson Historic Preservation Foundation, a community-based non-profit 501c3 organization in 2008. He first served as president of the board and then CEO. In that role, Clinco developed numerous community-based preservation initiatives, programs, and projects including working to preserve Tucson neon signs, a model program that was replicated throughout the United States. Clinco was the primary author of numerous National Register of Historic Places individual and district nominations including the Sunshine Mile, Miracle Mile, and Indian Ridge. In addition to numerous peer-reviewed and published articles, Clinco authored the nomination of Arizona US80 as a historic road across the State of Arizona. He created, developed, and oversaw Tucson Modernism Week, annual ten-day events; served as editor of Tucson Modernism Magazine, worked on Historic Film repatriation, created an Annual Historic Home Tour, author, and nominated Tucson as a Preserve America City, designation through President's Advisory Council on Historic Preservation. Oversaw the purchase and preservation planning of the Arthur T. Brown designed Ball-Paylore House, the Charles Clement designed Bondante House, and the Bernard Friedman designed Hirsh's Shoes building.

== Leadership roles ==
He is the executive director of the Tucson Historic Preservation Foundation, having assumed this role in 2015 after six years (2008–2014) as president of the board of directors. Clinco was a member of the Arizona State House of Representative (2014–2015), serving on the Financial Institutions and Government Committees. From 2007 to 2014, he served as the City of Tucson Mayor's appointee to the Tucson-Pima County Historic Commission, and has been involved in local, state and national public policy issues related to Historic Preservation and Cultural Resources. Since 2010 has served as the Arizona State Advisor to the National Trust for Historic Preservation, becoming Vice Chair from 2014 to 2015, representing the Western Region. In July 2026 Clinco was appointed to the Pima Country Bond Advisory Committee and subsequently elected the committee chair.

== Other non-profit and for-profit positions ==
Clinco served member of the Board of Directors of Archeology Southwest, the Arizona Preservation Foundation, and is a founding member of the “Arizona Vintage Sign Coalition.” In 2011, Clinco led the creation Tucson Modernism Week. Clinco has served on numerous foundation and non profit boards, including as a trustee of The Gregory School (formally St. Gregory College Preparatory School) and a member of the Southern Arizona Leadership Council. He is a member of the 2014 “Next City Vanguard” class and a 2013 “Flinn Brown Fellow.” Clinco is the vice-president of Catalina In-Home Services, Inc. and has received numerous awards in the field of architectural and heritage preservation including the 2017 Arizona Governor's Heritage Preservation Honor Award.

Demion Clinco is the son of Dr. Paul and Judy Clinco and great grandson of Alexis Romm and May Romm.
