= Bernard Friedman (disambiguation) =

Bernard Friedman (1896–1984) was a South African politician.

Bernard Friedman may also refer to:

- Bernard A. Friedman (born 1943), U.S. federal judge
- Bernard J. Friedman (1916–2012), American architect
- Bernie Friedman, American attorney
- Bernardas Fridmanas (1859–1939), or Bernard Naftal Friedman, Minister for Jewish Affairs of Lithuania, 1923
- B. H. Friedman (1926–2011), American author and art critic
