= Jacobson House (Tucson, Arizona) =

- Joan and Arthur Jacobson House
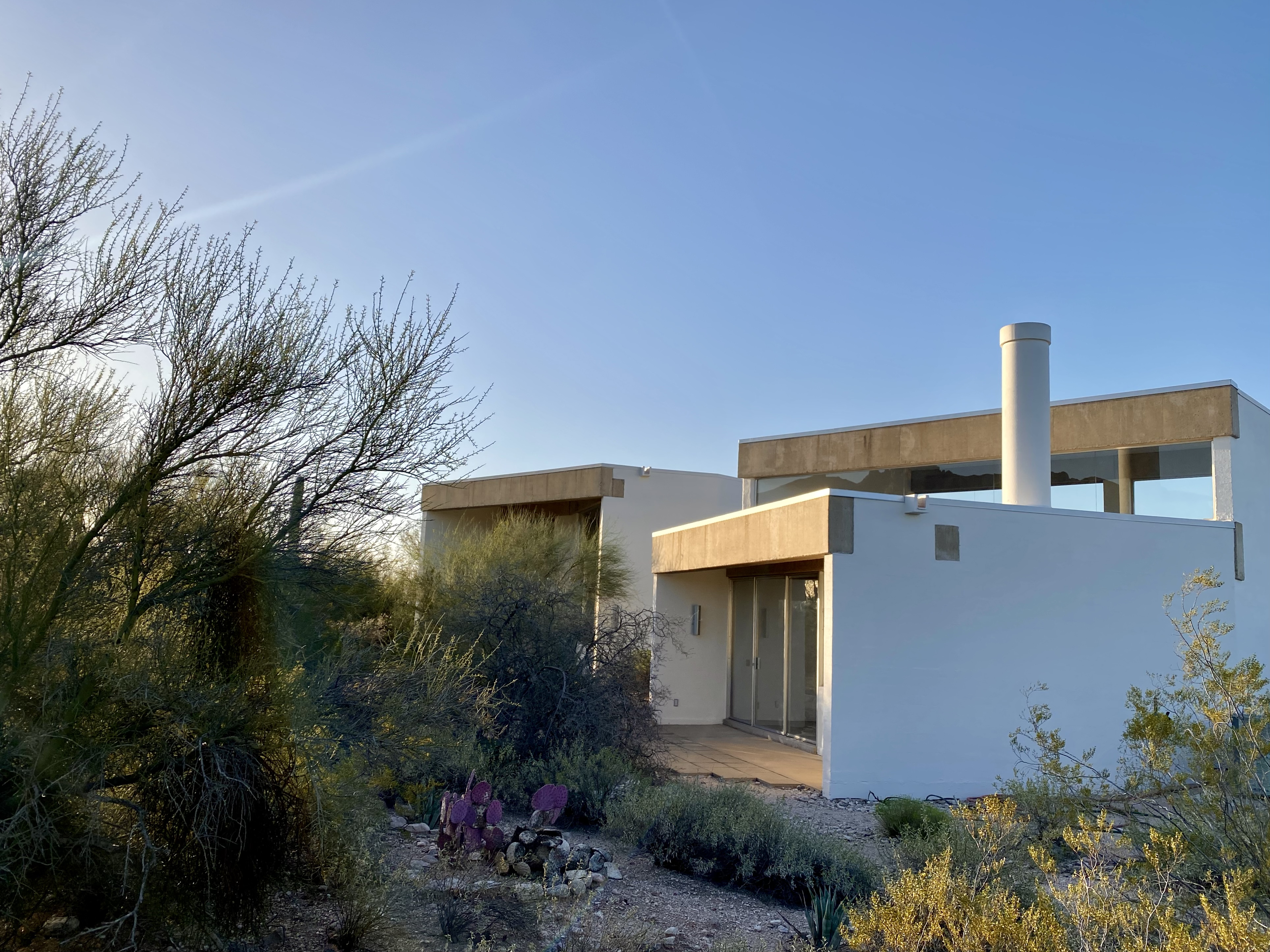
- Jacobson House North Elevation

General information
- Architectural style: Brutalism, Critical Regionalism
- Location: Tucson, Pima County, Arizona, United States
- Construction started: 1975
- Completed: 1977
- Client: Joan and Arthur Jacobson

Technical details
- Structural system: Site Cast Concrete Beam
- Floor area: about 3000 sq ft. [CONVERT]

Design and construction
- Architect: Judith Chafee

U.S. National Register of Historic Places
- Official name: Jacobson House
- Reference no.: 100007931

The Jacobson House is a residential building located in Tucson, Arizona, designed by the American architect Judith Chafee. The house was commissioned in 1975 by clients Joan and Arthur Jacobson and completed in 1977. The property was listed on the National Register of Historic Places in 2022 and designated a Pima County Historic Landmark in 2022.

== Judith Chafee ==
Judith Chafee (1932–1998) was an American architect and educator who made significant contributions to the architecture of the American Southwest. Chafee was born in Chicago, Illinois. Chafee attended Francis W. Parker School, before matriculating into Bennington College in Bennington, Vermont, graduating with a major in visual arts in 1954. In 1956 she enrolled in Yale University's Graduate School of Arts and Architecture (Yale School of Architecture) and was the only woman to graduate from her class.

She went on to work for nationally recognized architectural firms including, Paul Rudolph on the development of projects including the Yale University Art and Architecture Building and Married Student Housing and later job captain for residential projects in Baltimore. In 1962 she accepted a position with Walter Gropius' The Architects Collaborative (TAC) and worked on education projects for Brandeis University and Radcliffe College. After a year in Cambridge, Massachusetts, she accepted a position with Eero Saarinen and Associates in Connecticut where she worked on projects including Cummings Diesel in Darlington England and the international terminal for the TWA Flight Center at John F. Kennedy Airport. She then worked for five years at the Edward Larrabee Barnes Office in New Haven and ran a small private practice.

In 1969 Chafee moved back to Tucson and opened her own practice. Chafee taught at the University of Arizona from 1975 until her death in 1998. She was awarded the American Institute of Architects (AIA) Arizona's Lifetime Achievement Award posthumously in 2002.

== Comparison to Chafee's other major works ==
The Jacobson House is considered one of Chafee's significant foundational works, alongside the Viewpoint House, Ramada House and the demolished Blackwell House.

== Recognition and legacy ==
The Jacobson House was added to the National Register of Historic Places and designated a Pima County Historic Landmark in 2022, recognizing the significance of Chafee's work and her contributions to the architecture of the American Southwest. The house remains a testament to Chafee's design philosophy, which sought to create architecture that was both sensitive to its context and responsive to the needs of its inhabitants. The house underwent a major restoration led by Demion Clinco between 2021 and 2022.
