= Ridin' Wild =

Ridin' Wild can refer to:

- Ridin' Wild (1922 film), a 1922 American silent film
- Ridin' Wild (1925 film), a 1925 American silent film

== See also ==
- Riding Wild, a 1935 American western directed by David Selman
