= Ball-Paylore House =

Historic house in Arizona, United States

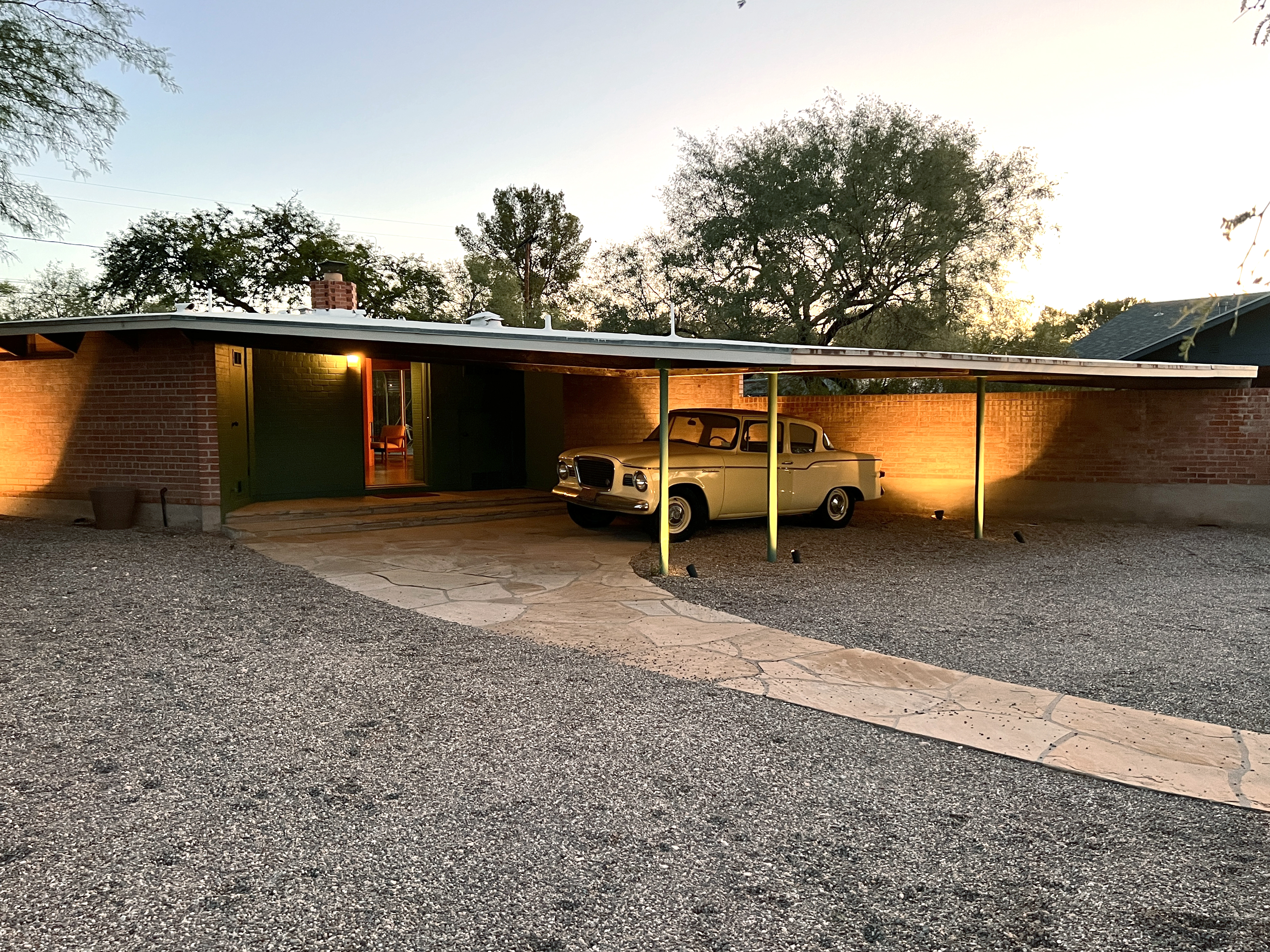
- Front (North Elevation

- Location within Arizona
- Interactive map showing the location of Ball-Paylore House
- Location: 2306 E. Waverly St., Tucson, Arizona
- Area: .34 acres (0.14 ha)
- Built: 1952
- Architect: Arthur Brown
- Architectural style: Modern
- Added to NRHP: October 29, 2003

The Ball-Paylore House, designed by architect Arthur T. Brown, FAIA, and built in 1952, is an example of post-WWII American architecture in Tucson, Arizona. When built the house was published locally and nationally. Today it is listed in the National Register of Historic Places, in the Arizona Register of Historic Places, and designated a City of Tucson Historic Landmark. The property is owned by the Tucson Historic Preservation Foundation, available for tours and overnight stays.

== History ==
Commissioned by two young University of Arizona librarians, Phyllis Ball and Patricia Paylore, the small 1203 sq ft site-specific house was conceived to meet their needs, create a refuge in the desert, and bolster indoor-outdoor livability. Designed by Arthur T. Brown, FAIA, and built by Robert Thomas, the house has become an icon of desert modernism.

Understated and plain from the street, the geometry of the house opens up as you enter the front door. The front facade, with a focus on privacy and minimal ornamentation, is characterized by an angular open carport, mortar-washed brick, and windows set high between the beams at the ceiling. This creates a strong juxtaposition to the interior which is open and expansive with interactive glass window walls blurring the lines between the indoor and outdoor patios and yard. The geometry of the house creates a living room that wraps around the three-sided fireplace and into the kitchen with radiating beams that combine with the glass window walls to create a sense of space greater than the actual dimensions of the rooms.

A unique feature of the house is the aluminum shades over the terrace, designed to move across the semi-circle area and provide a responsive shade solution and giving the facade an expressive appearance.

The built-in casework including bookshelves and desks was designed and built by noted artisan craftsman Jack Kelso of Desert House. The ceilings are paneled with hemlock and the beams and kitchen cabinetry are Douglas fr finished in a driftwood stain.

== Regogniation and legacy ==
From the very start, the house was recognized locally as an important work. The house was extensively published locally and nationally. In 1959, the Southern Arizona Chapter of the American Institute of Architects.

partnered with the Tucson Daily Citizen to present the property as a notable project and design. The full-page feature story noted, “Challenging and completely different is this small home.” The house was also featured in House Beautiful magazine in October 1962.

The house was listed in the National Register of Historic Places on October 29, 2003, as a contributing property in the Catalina Vista Historic District.

In 2012, the house was listed, alongside Taliesin West, Arcosanti, Ramada House, and the Burton Barr Central Library, as one of the five most important architectural works in Arizona by the Arizona Daily Star in their edition Arizona at 100: The Best of Arizona from 1912 to the present. In 2017 the house was also featured nationally in the American real estate blog; Curbed, and in the Society of Architectural Historians’ Archipedia in 2018.

In Spring 2019 the longtime owners of the Ball-Paylore House died, leaving the fate of this significant post-WWII experimental passive solar home in the balance. The house and its original contents were purchased by the Tucson Historic Preservation Foundation. The property underwent a major restoration and conservation program.

The preservation, protection, and restoration of the property were featured in numerous national publications. The House was designed as a City of Tucson Historic Landmark and listed on the National Register of Historic Places and is a member of the international Iconic House network.

Today, visitors can tour the property and stay overnight.
