= The Painted Trail =

The Painted Trail may refer to:

- The Painted Trail (1928 film), an American silent western film
- The Painted Trail (1938 film), an American western film
