= Hirsh's Shoes =

Mid-century modern building in Tucson, Arizona

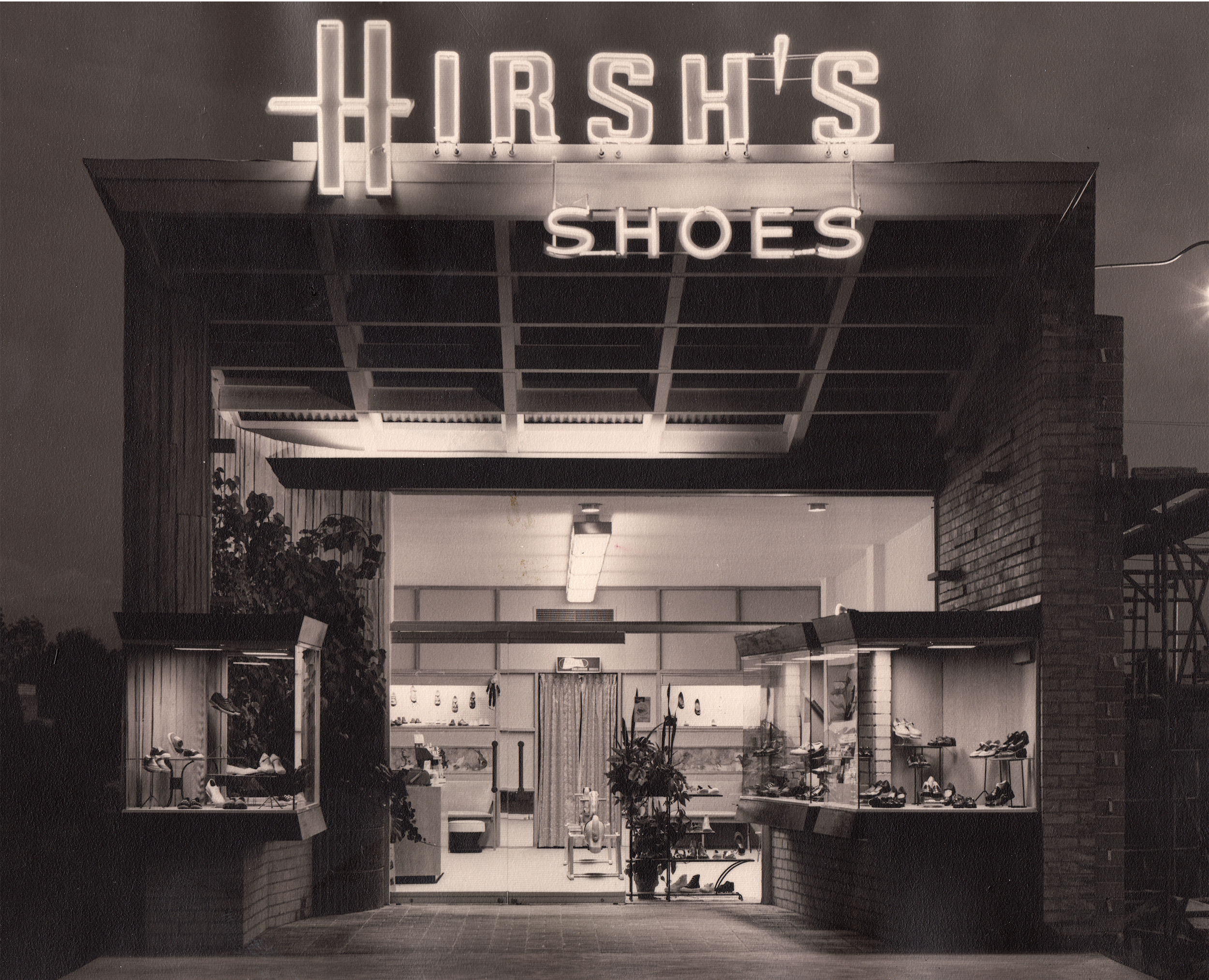
- Hirsh's Shoes 1954, north facade
- Location: 2934 E Broadway Blvd, Tucson, Arizona 85716
- Built: 1954
- Architect: Bernard Friedman
- Architectural style: Modern
- Governing body: Private

Hirsh's Shoes is a mid-century modern store building located in Tucson, Arizona, United States. Designed in 1954 by Jewish-American architect Bernard "Bernie" Friedman for entrepreneur Rose Hirsh, the open-plan storefront is an iconic retail standard. Rose C. Hirsh hired Friedman to design this building as a free-standing shop in what would become an early strip mall. Though now surrounded by other buildings, it was owned and operated by the Hirsh family from its construction in 1954 until 2016. The opening of the store was featured in the Arizona Daily Star on April 7, 1954. For 62 years, the Hirsh family maintained the character-defining architectural features of the north facade and unique architectural expression that defined the mid-century era. In 2014, the Hirsh family restored the roof-mounted neon sign.

== History ==
Hirsh's Shoes is located in the heart of Broadway's Sunshine Mile. Broadway Boulevard's post-WWII development reflected the new American economic optimism following the war. Like many cities, Tucson was growing rapidly. In 1940, the population was 35,000; by 1960, it had soared to 212,000. As an important suburban corridor, modern structures were built along Broadway's edge to support new neighborhoods with their curved streets and rambling ranch houses.

A collection of mid-century modern buildings designed by Tucson's most influential architects shaped this modernist boulevard. Bernard Friedman, Fred Jobusch, William Wilde, Anne Rysdale, Nicholas Sakellar, Charles Cox, Cain, Nelson and Ware, Howard Peck, and Ronald Bergquist all contributed to the unique character of this commercial shopping district through their regional modernist designs.

Glass storefronts, geometric designs, new materials, and evocative signage combined to create a vision of Tucson as a modern metropolis. In 1953, the East Broadway Merchants sponsored a contest to name the strip between Campbell and Country Club. The winning entry was "The Sunshine Mile". The modernist architectural heritage of this street is an irreplaceable regional asset that should be celebrated, honored and cultivated. It is a significant part of Tucson's story and the American experience.

== David and Rose Hirsh ==
David Hirsh emigrated as a child with his parents from Eastern Europe to Pennsylvania, where they owned a successful boot shop. David's wife, Rose, was a first-generation Pennsylvania native. Seeking a warmer climate to help with Rose's arthritis, the family relocated to Tucson in 1944. In 1954, architect Bernard Friedman was commissioned by Rose to design a modern building for her new shoe store in the emerging suburban shopping district along Broadway Boulevard near Broadway Village. The Hirsh's Shoes building, although now sandwiched between other buildings, was originally designed as a freestanding structure. As a rare surviving example of the popular open front façade, its interior and exterior zones are fully integrated. The dynamic entrance is topped with the original neon letterforms. For 62 years, the Hirsh family maintained the unique architectural expression, typical of the best mid-century retail storefronts. In 2015, the Hirsh family was honored with a preservation award from the Tucson-Pima County Historical Commission for their stewardship of Hirsh's Shoes building.

== Bernard Friedman, architect ==
Bernard J. Friedman's (1916–2012) architectural work contributed to Tucson's mid-century modern commercial design idiom. Between 1940 and the 1970s, his small and large-scale projects distinguished downtown Tucson and the emerging suburbs with a progressive architectural identity. Through structural expressions, elegant proportions, and chic design, his commercial, educational and religious buildings mirror national and international trends, adapted to our desert climate. With bold architectural statements, he displayed the excitement of modernism without sacrificing the elegance and monumentality of his civic designs.

Born to immigrant parents and raised in Chicago, Friedman graduated with a Bachelor of Science degree in Architecture from the University of Illinois in 1938 and moved to Tucson in 1940. During World War II, he served as a Construction Officer with the U.S. Navy Civil Engineer Corps in the European theatre between 1942 and 1946.

Friedman was discharged in 1946 and returned to Tucson, where he married his wife, Irma. Between 1946 and 1948, he partnered with architect William Green to design several residential and commercial projects, including Los Patio at 3318 – 40 East 1st Street, the El Presidio Hotel at Broadway, multiple Fourth Avenue buildings, and the new Temple Emanu‐el auditorium at 225 North Country Club Road. The 650-seat auditorium was designed to be eclipsed by and integrated into the future sanctuary.

In February 1948, Friedman announced the establishment of an independent architecture and allied design practice with offices at 210 North Church Street. Friedman's commercial architecture of this period embraced the mid-century modernist movement, emphasizing the progressive use of glass, new materials, structural systems, and sculptural forms. In 1949, Friedman designed the Given Brothers Shoes Co. building at 57 E. Pennington, and the Recreational and Social Center for the Jewish Community Center on Tucson Boulevard. In early 1951, Friedman designed a new school building for Congregation Anshei Israel.

During the 1951 to 1953 Korean War, Lieutenant Commander Friedman was called back to Washington, D.C. to serve as Coordinator for the Engineering & Technical Services Division, Bureau of Yards and Docks. He returned from active duty in August 1953 and reopened his architectural practice in a building he designed at 2233 East Broadway. In September, he had been commissioned to design the new Jewish Community Center on Plummer Avenue, north of Broadway, replacing the existing building at 134 S. Tucson Boulevard. That same year, he designed the Rillito Park steel and concrete grandstand, and a subdivision model house called The Arizona Contemporary, built by J. R. Schibley at 7210 North Oracle Road.

In 1954, Friedman designed two iconic modernist storefronts that expressed the post-WWII era American commercial architecture; Daniel's Jewelers at 21 E. Congress, built by M. M. Sundt Construction, and Hirsh's Shoes at 2934 East Broadway Boulevard. A 1955 commercial building at 2901 Broadway for Mr. and Mrs. Max Saltzman represents a clear departure from the narrow storefronts synonymous with dense commercial districts and development patterns of the pre‐war era. The Saltzman building was designed to engage the attention of commuters in fast-moving automobiles. This is a building as a billboard with expansive glass curtain walls, integrated panel monument signage, and interior illumination to showcase the merchandise after dark.

In October 1956, Friedman & Jobusch Architects & Engineers was created with Friedman's university classmate, Fred H. Jobusch. Jobusch had moved to Tucson in 1944. He served as the president of the Southern Arizona Chapter of the American Institute of Architects, the Southern Arizona Chapter of the Arizona Society of Professional Engineers, and the President of The Sertoma Club of Tucson. From 1953 through 1959, he served as a member of the State Board of Technical Registration for Architects and Engineers.

Between 1956 and the early 1960s, the firm designed multiple commercial buildings in Tucson. Along the Sunshine Mile, they designed the Broadway Building at 2221 E. Broadway, Nehring Insurance Agency at 2605-2609 E. Broadway, Arnie Rents at 1501 E. Broadway and the Arizona Bank Building at 2102 E. Broadway. Elsewhere, the firm designed Kal Rubin City, Amphi Plaza Shopping Center, Copa Bowl, Jewish Community Center additions, Gordon's El Rancho store at 3396 East Speedway, the Cactus Bowl, the Zeta Beta Tau fraternity house, the Alpha Epsilon Phi sorority house, Campbell Plaza Shopping Center, the El Dorado Motel in Nogales and Tucson City Hall. During this period, they also completed work on a shopping center in Key West, Florida. Friedman and Jobusch designed the first Levy's at the new El Con Mall in the 1960s. This project was a joint venture between Friedman and Jobusch Architects and Albert C. Martin and Associates of Los Angeles.

Besides a large canon of commercial work, the firm also developed a specialty in educational buildings, designing the University of Arizona College of Medicine, the Agricultural Sciences Building, the Physics-Math-Meteorology Building, the Pharmacy‐Microbiology Building, and the Chemistry Building. Other educational work included Pima Community College, Sahuaro High School, Canyon del Oro High School, Donaldson Elementary School, Katherine Van Buskirk Elementary School, and Clara Fish Roberts Elementary School.

Friedman's projects covered a broad range of commercial, civic, and municipal buildings, including the Tucson Community Center; Tucson Music Hall; Astrophysics, Environmental, Electronic, Instrumentation, Computer and Optical Laboratory facilities for Kitt Peak National Observatory, the Chris-Town Mall in Phoenix, and the Plaza International Hotel and Aztec Inn. In addition to the Temple Emanu-El, he also designed other religious buildings, including Congregation Anshei Israel, St. Albans Episcopal Church, St. Mark's Methodist Church, and Streams in the Desert Lutheran Church. Friedman was interested in the role of landscape and included integrated landscape design in his later projects.

The sculptural 1971 Valley National Bank Branch on the northwest corner of Country Club Road and Broadway Boulevard is perhaps Friedman's most recognized and iconic building. Featured in national magazines and on television, this building is a true regional landmark and a beloved example of modern design. During his career Friedman served as president of the Southern Arizona Chapter of the American Institute of Architects, a member on the AIA Planning and Zoning Committee, a member of the Architectural Advisory Committee of Pima County, Arizona, the Architectural Advisor for the Tucson Jewish Community Center, a member of the Board of Directors of the Tucson Botanical Society, the Tucson Chamber of Commerce, the Tucson Festival Society, and a member of the City of Tucson Building Code Review Committee.

Bernard J. Friedman died on June 21, 2012, at the age of 96.

== Architecture ==
The north elevation of Hirsh's Shoes is the primary character-defining facade. It is a rare surviving example of the "open-storefront" trend in retail design that emerged following WWII. The open storefront design was initiated among leading commercial architects like Morris Lapidus in the 1940s and was commonly practiced on Main Streets by the 1950s. Hirsh's Shoes features an open exterior lobby (called an arcade by Friedman) that was created by setting back the glass window wall and entry door from the sidewalk and deeply angling the walls and ceiling inwards. Cantilevered showcase boxes project from both the east furrowed redwood palings and west exposed red brick walls frame the open-air lobby. The red brick floor is set in mortar in a basket weave pattern. The front random laid exposed motor washed bricks create a pilaster. The original letter-forms neon sign is perched atop the extended roof system above the open display lobby. All of the exterior display lobby details are intact.

== Contemporary context ==
Hirsh's Shoes was featured in The New York Times in the summer of 2015, highlighting Tucson's modern architecture. With the impending Broadway Boulevard widening project, historically insensitive redevelopments to adjacent properties, and rumors of the business closing, the Tucson Historic Preservation Foundation contacted the Hirsh family in 2015 to discuss long-term preservation planning strategies. Following numerous discussions about the threats to the long-term preservation of the building, the THPF entered into a purchase contract in the spring of 2016 to save it. The THPF officially acquired the property on September 23, 2016.

On October 5, 2016, the Sunshine Mile was designated by the National Trust for Historic Preservation as one of the 2016 "11 Most Endangered Properties in America". The Hirsh's Shoes building has become a symbol of mid-century design in Tucson.
