= Levy's =

Levy's may refer to:

- Henry S. Levy and Sons, a former bakery in Brooklyn
- Levy's (department store), a former department store chain in Arizona
