= The Mine with the Iron Door (1924 film) =

1924 film

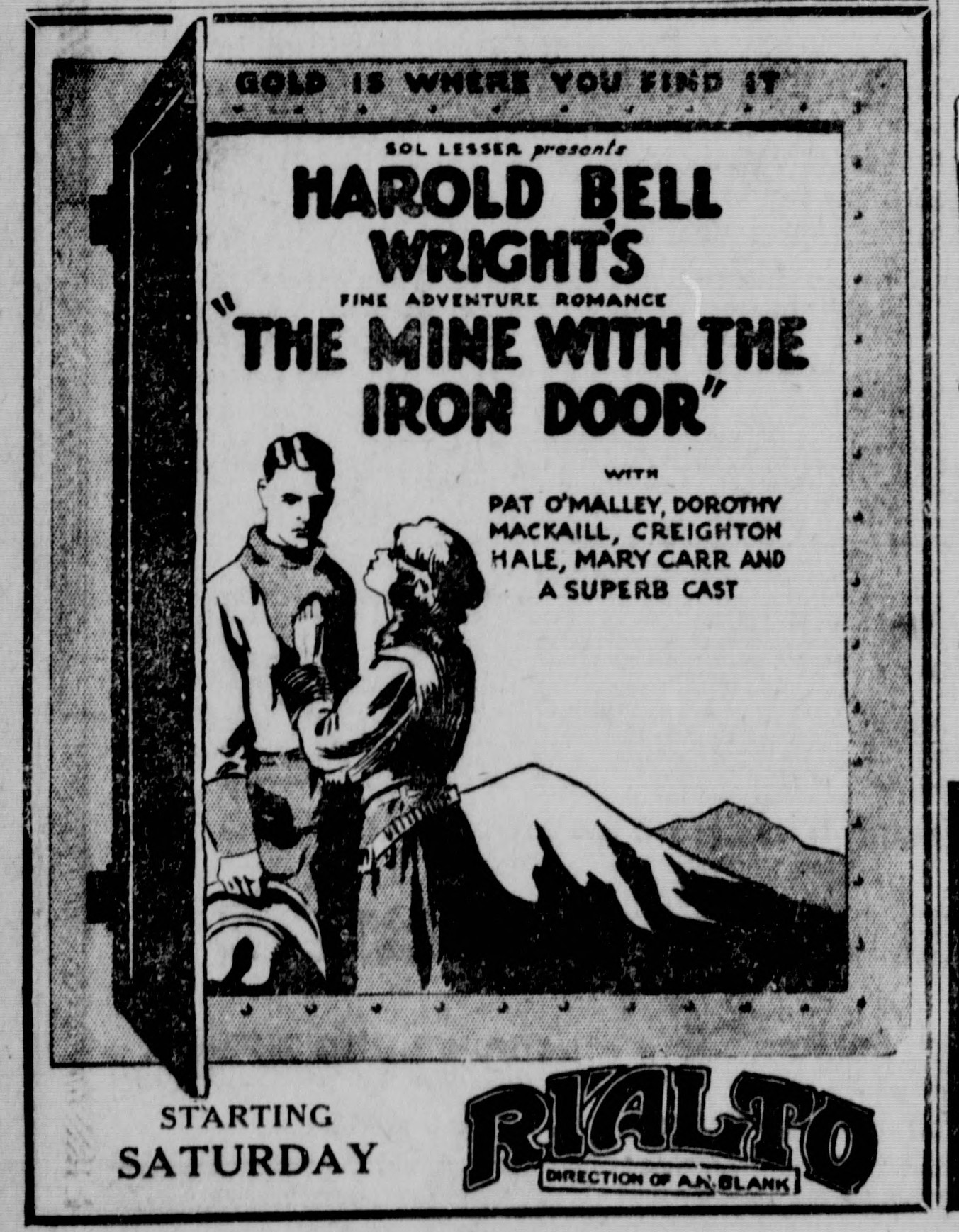
- Contemporary advertisement
- Directed by: Sam Wood
- Written by: Louis D. Lighton (adaptation); Hope Loring (adaptation); Mary Alice Scully; Arthur F. Statter
- Based on: The Mine with the Iron Door by Harold Bell Wright
- Produced by: Sol Lesser
- Starring: Dorothy Mackaill; Pat O'Malley
- Cinematography: Glen MacWilliams
- Distributed by: Principal Pictures Corporation
- Release date: October 2, 1924 (United States)
- Running time: 80 minutes
- Country: United States
- Languages: Silent; English intertitles

The Mine with the Iron Door is a 1924 American silent Western film directed by Sam Wood and produced by Sol Lesser. The film is based on the novel of the same name by American author Harold Bell Wright that was published in 1923.

In 1936 it was remade as the sound film The Mine with the Iron Door.

== Plot ==
As described in a review in a film magazine, Bob Hill and Thad Grave, two aged prospectors, find a little girl in the hut of bandit Sonora Jack and take her away, but are unable to locate her parents. When Marta grows to womanhood, Hugh Edwards appears on the scene, and they fall in love. Natachee, an educated Indian who hates the white race, learns that Edwards is an escaped convict who was convicted for embezzling funds. Edwards saves his life and in return Natachee shows him the location of the lost mine with the iron door, formerly worked by the Dominican priests and filled with gold. Just then Sonora Jack returns and, unable to find the mine, kidnaps Marta to hold her for ransom. Hugh and Natchee overtake and kill him while rescuing Marta. Papers prove that Marta is the daughter of the man for whom Hugh was falsely sent to prison and that he has since died confessing his guilt. Hugh and Marta find happiness in their love for each other.

== Cast ==
- Dorothy Mackaill as Marta Hilgrove
- Pat O'Malley as Hugh Edwards
- Raymond Hatton as The Lizard
- Bert Woodruff as Thad Grove
- Charles Murray as Bob Hill
- Mitchell Lewis as Sonora Jack
- Mary Carr as St. Jimmy's Mother
- William Collier Jr. as Chico
- Creighton Hale as St. Jimmy
- Robert Frazer as Natachee
- Clarence Burton as The Sheriff
- Lillian Leighton

== Production ==
The Mine with the Iron Door was shot on location in the Tucson Arizona Valley, Oracle, and Mount Lemmon, Arizona. While shooting the film, the cast and crew stayed at the Triangle L Ranch and the Wilson Ranch (Rancho Linda Vista) outside of Oracle off of Historic U.S. Route 80. It was filmed in Tucson at the insistence of the author Harold Bell Wright, who lived there at the time.

The film premiered at the Rialto Theatre in Tucson.

== Preservation ==
A print of The Mine with the Iron Door is preserved in Gosfilmofond and Archives Du Film Du CNC, Bois d'Arcy, France.

In 2010 the French copy of the film was tracked down by historian Demion Clinco and shown by the Tucson Historic Preservation Foundation at the Rialto Theater. As part of the screening, the English intertitles were recreated and an original musical score composed by New York-based conductor and composer Brian Holman.

== See also ==
- List of rediscovered films
