= Tucson Historic Preservation Foundation =

Historical society in Pima County, Arizona

Logo of THPF

The Tucson Historic Preservation Foundation is a private, nonprofit organization dedicated to the preservation of the historic, architectural, as well as cultural heritage of Tucson, Arizona. Through advocacy initiatives, educational programs, architectural resources, and cultural events, the foundation’s goal is to encourage the community to learn about and preserve the historic buildings that make the Tucson and Pima County unique.

== History ==
Founded in 1985, the organization is committed to honoring and preserving Tucson's unique architectural treasures and public spaces. During the early 1980s, a growing concern over the continual demolition of historic buildings sparked the conception of a non-profit organization that could actively protect and advocate for Tucson's historic built environment. In March 1985, the Tucson Historic Preservation Foundation was established for the purpose of acquiring, maintaining, and preserving endangered historic properties in the Tucson area. The Tucson-Pima County Historical Commission was instrumental in helping organize the Foundation. Judge Norman S. Fenton, the first president of the new non-profit, said: "The Foundation was created by those who felt frustrated at having to stand helplessly by on many occasions and see historical buildings and part of Tucson's heritage destroyed because there was not an appropriate organization available for their acquisition and preservation."

Ironically initial funding for the Foundation came from the sale of salvageable materials donated by Frank McClure and Homes Tuttle Ford from the demolition of the Spanish Revival Mansion "Avalon House" on Oracle Road. The Foundation's primary goal was to establish a solid financial base that would enable THPF to act quickly, if necessary, to save endangered historic buildings. Although the foundation never fulfilled it intended mission, it did influence the protection and stabilization of many Tucson Historic Properties. Funds from the Foundation were loaned to Fort Lowell Neighborhood Association to preserve the Historic San Pedro Chapel. In the early 1990s, the Foundation became dormant. In 2008 under the leadership of Demion Clinco the organization was restructured and a new board established.

The organization has been able to save Tucson's neon signs, listed numerous building on the National Register of Historic Places and as Local Historic Landmarks. The Tucson Historic Preservation Foundation launched Tucson Modernism Week in 2011 and continues to manage the annual educational program. The foundation has worked to save southern Arizona's early silent film heritage including restoration and screenings of silent films shot in Tucson and southern Arizona including The Mine with the Iron Door and Ridin' Wild (1925 film). As of 2016, Demion Clinco serves as the Executive Director.

In 2016 the Foundation purchased and saved the Hirsh's Shoes building, located at 2934 E Broadway Blvd in Tucson and in 2019, saved, purchased and restored the Ball-Paylore House.

== Awards ==
Each year the Foundation presents awards to recognize the individuals, organizations and projects that work to preserve Tucson's heritage :

- The Grand Punch Bowl Award. Each year, the Preservation Foundation Board of Directors honor an individual who has contributed not only to the foundation’s mission, but has made a significant contribution the work of preservation in the Tucson community. The honoree keep the bowl until a new individual is recognized. The historic punch bowl originally served guests for decades starting in 1947 at the Lodge on the Desert.
- The Presidents's Award. Starting in 2012 and continuing yearly, the president of the Tucson Historic Preservation Foundation has recognized a board member for their extraordinary contribution to the organization.

== Archives ==
The organization's Archives exist to sustain the mission of the foundation by collecting, preserving, organizing, and encouraging use of its historical documents and research materials. Maintained are a collection of books, historic documents, resource materials and photographs dealing with architecture, Tucson, Arizona history, historic preservation, as well as horticulture and landscape architecture.
