= Her Night of Romance =

1924 film by Sidney Franklin

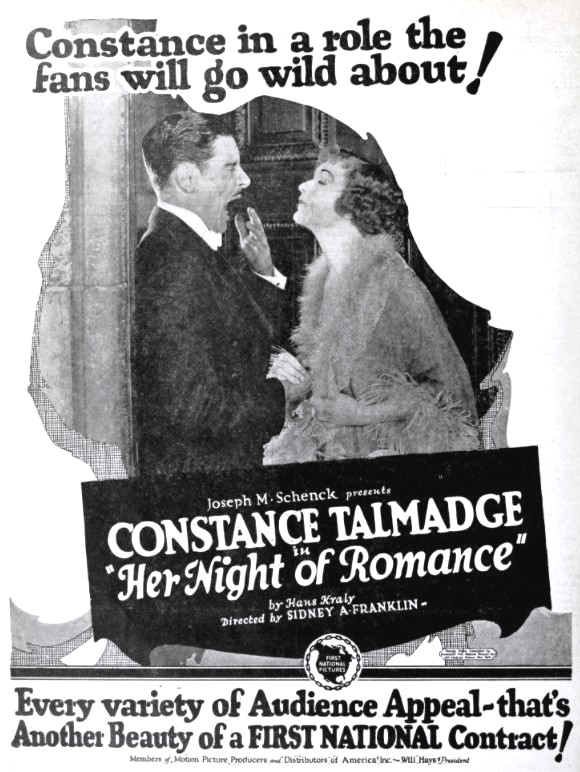
- Trade advertisement
- Directed by: Sidney Franklin
- Written by: Hanns Kräly (scenario)
- Produced by: Constance Talmadge; Joseph M. Schenck
- Starring: Constance Talmadge; Ronald Colman
- Cinematography: Ray Binger; Victor Milner
- Edited by: Hal C. Kern
- Distributed by: First National Pictures
- Release date: October 1924
- Running time: 8 reels; 7,211 feet
- Country: United States
- Language: Silent (English intertitles)

Her Night of Romance is a 1924 American silent film written by Hanns Kräly and directed by Sidney Franklin. The romantic comedy stars Constance Talmadge and Ronald Colman. The film is extant and was scheduled to be shown in 2016.

== Plot ==
American millionaire Samuel C. Adams brings his daughter Dorothy to England to see a specialist about her heart trouble. So that she will not be hounded by the press and fortune hunters, Dorothy makes herself up to look extremely plain. Impoverished Lord Paul Menford spies her without the hideous disguise and falls in love with her immediately. When he is mistaken for his uncle, the heart specialist Adams seeks, he goes along in order to meet her. Meanwhile, his agent sells the Menford family estate to Adams. When Menford finally admits the ruse, Dorothy sends him away.

Later that night, he gets drunk and goes home, only he has forgotten that he no longer lives at the Menford estate. He crawls into his old room, only to find Dorothy there. Frightened, she makes him leave and barricades the door for good measure. However, he just reenters the room through another door. When she faints, he picks her up and carries her into another bedroom. The butler, his old former servant, sees him do this.

The next morning, Dorothy comes down for breakfast, and is annoyed to find the butler has put out two table settings. When one of Paul's friends shows up unexpectedly and finds them dining together, Paul introduces Dorothy as his wife to avoid a scandal. The butler overhears, and soon the joyous "news" has spread to the village. Dorothy's father arrives. When the villagers gather outside to loudly wish the newlyweds well, Mr. Adams believes that his daughter has married as well. Paul eventually tries to clear things up, but Adams thinks he is just joking. Adams is finally convinced when he finds Paul preparing to sleep in a different bedroom from his "wife".

Having gotten over her initial dislike for Paul, she agrees to his suggestion that they get married for real. However, when she overhears Joe Diamond congratulating Paul for landing a wealthy heiress and demanding 10% as promised, the wedding is off. Paul sadly leaves.

Dorothy's father sees that she is heartbroken without Paul. Paul returns, having received a letter from her, apologizing for her behaviour and asking him to come see her before he leaves for Paris. She is puzzled (but secretly overjoyed), as she did not write it. While Paul packs some of his belongings, she goes to consult her father, who confesses that he is responsible. She begs him to do something to keep Paul from leaving. He has Paul's car sent away and creates a fake rainstorm using a hose. Paul is taken in at first, but then sees that it is only raining on one side of the house. Realizing Dorothy still loves him, Paul kisses her.

== Cast ==
- Constance Talmadge as Dorothy Adams
- Ronald Colman as Paul Menford
- Jean Hersholt as Joe Diamond
- Albert Gran as Samuel C. Adams
- Robert Rendel as Prince George
- Sidney Bracey as Butler
- Joseph J. Dowling as Professor Gregg
- Templar Saxe as Dr. Wellington
- Eric Mayne as Dr. Scott
- Emily Fitzroy as Nurse
- Clara T. Bracy as Housekeeper
- James O. Barrows as Old Butler
- Claire de Lorez as Artist
- Michael Dark as Photographer (uncredited)

== Reception ==
In his review for The New York Times, Mordaunt Hall wrote that the film was "a lively pictorial farce-comedy, with the fair and effervescent Constance Talmadge ... the principal attraction", while Colman gave "an easy and natural performance".
