= Jerry Blackwell House =

Blackwell House
- Jerry Blackwell House

General information
- Architectural style: Brutalism, Critical Regionalism
- Location: Tucson, Pima County, Arizona, United States
- Current tenants: Demolished by Pima County
- Construction started: 1979
- Completed: 1979
- Client: Jerry Blackwell

Technical details
- Structural system: Concrete block and cast concrete beam
- Floor area: 1800 sq ft [CONVERT]

Design and construction
- Architect: Judith Chafee

The Blackwell House was a 1,800 square-foot (1,570 square-foot plan) residence located in the Tucson Mountains west of the City of Tucson, Arizona. Designed by master architect Judith Chafee, FAIA in 1978 the house pioneered passive solar building design including heating and cooling concepts, natural materials that would require minimal maintenance, and a minimized negative impact on the ecosystem surrounding it. Designed for Jerry Blackwell, an openly LGBTQ Old Tucson Studios film executive, the house was immediately recognized as a masterwork. The siting, architectural composition, and arrangement of living spaces exemplified the tenets of critical regionalism. The property was purchased in 1987 by Pima County in a plan to expand Tucson Mountain Park. After a decade of county neglect, public controversy, and efforts to save the house it was demolished by Pima County in 1998. The demolition is considered one of the county's most significant preservation mistakes and diminished the culture heritage of Southern Arizona and American modern architecture.

== Design and construction ==
The house was commissioned by Jerry Blackwell, an executive vice president of Old Tucson Studios. The house was constructed of concrete blocks, steel frame, and glass window walls, rough plank ceilings and site cast concrete beams.

== Jerry Blackwell ==
Jerry Blackwell, who commissioned the house was born in Walnut Springs, Texas in 1931. He moved to New York City to pressure acting and pivoted to become the nation's youngest manager of a Loews theater in the United States. In his role, he hosted numerous world premieres including Ben Hur and walked the red carpet with Marilyn Monroe for Some Like It Hot. He then became the head of MGM distribution for Films in Latin America. He moved to Tucson becoming the director of Palo Verde Mental Health Services and then executive vice president of Old Tucson Studios. Blackwell commissioned the house in 1979 and sold it to Pima County in 1987. Blackwell died of lung cancer in October 2003.

== Preservation ==
The house and its 7.3 acres were purchased in 1987 by Pima County with $225,000.00 UDS of voter-approved bond funding with the intention of demolishing it and revegetating the area to expand Tucson Mountain Park. The University of Arizona College of Architecture Dean Robert Hershberger sent an appeal to Pima County asking that demolition be reconsidered. The request was front-page news in Tucson newspapers. Hershberger stated that the house was "the finest example of what's called critical regionalism" and "If your jobs are to protect nature, this is probably the best example of how human beings can protect nature, this is singly a very historical resource in the community" and provided numerous adaptive reuse proposals including turning over the house to the college and allowing it to be used for student learning and visiting guests.

Despite the University of Arizona's intervention, Gale Bundrick, the Pima County Parks department administrator recommended destroying the house. The Pima County Parks and Recreation Commission voted on February 15, 1989, to pause demolition and study alternatives. The Tucson Citizen reported that Pima County Officials called the house a "concrete bunker" and "the biggest eyesore on Gatets Pass Road."

Chafee noted in an interview that "It’s there, and it was a serious piece of work. I think it becomes something in our culture one it has been executed that should be respected and allowed to have different functions the way old buildings do in our culture. They mean something to people for generations.[...] It’s got a lot of spatial delight. I think it uplifts the spirit. I think a good house gives you a feeling of joy. I suppose that sounds silly," she said. "I do think there’s a sort of spiritual uplifting in a new architectural experience that makes people see things in a different way."

Chafee authored a feature opinion in April 1989, appealing for the preservation of the house, "The Blackwell house was commissioned, conceived, built, and used as a deeply felt commitment to living in harmony with the desert environment in our time. It is ironic that an effort involving so much thought, care, and compassion could become the victim of a public agency that should be concerned with seeking and encouraging any ideas about human habitation that makes the places where we live more harmonious with our parks; a continuation of park land like the Blackwell house, which uses the surrounding mountains and rocks as the final walls of the living area. Too often our parks are places of retreat from the places we live, the places we have spoiled. Any understanding that contributes to our living within our desert is important to our future well-being."

The controversy over the house resulted in dozens of feature articles, reports, and opinions. Architects including Will Bruder, ASU professor Jeffery Cook, and Sunset Magazine editor William E. Crosby weighed in on the importance of saving this house.

In June 1989 a unanimous vote of the Pima County Board of Supervisors with a unanimous recommendation of the Parks Commission opted for preserving the house and allowing the University of Arizona to restore and use it.

Despite the unanimous vote to save the building, Pima County Parks and Recreation abandoned the house, stalled the finalization of a management agreement with the University of Arizona, did not secure the property, and allowed extensive vandalization. By 1991 every window was smashed, interior fixtures destroyed, extensive graffiti, and the interior damaged. The damage allowed to occur by Pima County substantially increased the cost to adaptively reuse the house.

In November 1992 Robert Hershberger notified the country that the University of Arizona would renege on its commitment to renovate and use the property. Assistant Country Manager Chuck Huckelberry told the board the house was a "continuing liability" and recommended the board take action to raze it.

By the end of November 1992 the University of Arizona architecture students began hands-on work to clean up the house. A group led by noted designer and UA architecture student, Rameen Ahmed, asked the Board of Supervisors for a 180-day stay of demolition. Again the house was spared, and the students and the UA were given 180 days to set up a conservancy and begin raising funds. The group partnered with the Southwest Center at the UA and began fundraising.

The group signed an agreement in December 1992 with the County which established benchmarks but provided no other support, funding or access. In June the conservancy group received a $25,000.00 state grant but required the county to sign a 10-year conservation easement. by July 1995 detractors including Carol Klamerus president of the Tucson Mountains Association speaking to reporters said, "We feel it’s better to get rid of this eyesore before someone ends up getting killed out there." Raul Grijalva pushed for demolition saying, "Their time has run out."

== Demolition ==
In August 1995 the Tucson Citizen editorial board led by C. Donald Hatfield, Mark Kimble, Jill Blondin, and Richardo Pimentel published a scathing opinion calling the house a toilet and advocating for its destruction.

Pima County, though total and systemic neglect, had from the time of purchase stopped all maintenance and security of the site allowing it to be damaged and extensively vandalized. Advocates felt that the County administration had done every thing possible to undermine the success of saving the landmark. Raul Grijalva, serving as Pima County Supervisor, worked to have the house demolished in 1995. In 1998, Pima County administrator Chuck Huckelberry recommended the demolition of the cultural resource and Grijalva voted to destroy the house. Grijalva was quoted at the time in the local papers that demolition "is the best thing for the property." On June 2, 1998, the Pima County Board of Supervisors voted to raze the house. Before the end of the month the Pima County spent close to half of the original restoration estimates to raze it.

After watching her landmark project be destroyed, five months later in November 1998, Judith Chafee died.

== Legacy ==
The demolition of the Blackwell House is considered one of the great preservation mistakes of Tucson's late 20th century history. The demolition served as a metaphor for regressive 20th-century views and treatment of women and female professionals, eradication of LGBTQ+ cultural contributions, and a disregard for modern architecture.

== Judith Chafee ==
Judith Chafee (1932–1998) was an American architect and educator who made significant contributions to the architecture of the American Southwest. Chafee was born in Chicago, Illinois. Chafee attended Francis W. Parker School, before matriculating into Bennington College in Bennington, Vermont, graduating with a major in visual arts in 1954. In 1956 she enrolled in Yale University's Graduate School of Arts and Architecture (Yale School of Architecture) and was the only woman to graduate from her class.

She went on to work for nationally recognized architectural firms including, Paul Rudolph on the development of projects including the Yale University Art and Architecture Building and Married Student Housing and later job captain for residential projects in Baltimore. In 1962 she accepted a position with Walter Gropius' The Architects Collaborative (TAC) and worked on education projects for education projects for Brandeis University and Radcliffe College. After a year in Cambridge, Massachusetts, she accepted a position with Eero Saarinen and Associates in Connecticut where she worked on projects including Cummings Diesel in Darlington England and the international terminal for the TWA Flight Center at John F. Kennedy Airport. She then worked for five years at the Edward Larrabee Barnes Office in New Haven and ran a small private practice.

In 1969 Chafee moved back to Tucson and opened her own practice. Chafee taught at the University of Arizona from 1975 until her death in 1998. She was awarded the American Institute of Architects (AIA) Arizona's Lifetime Achievement Award posthumously in 2002.

== Comparison to Chafee's other major works ==
The Blackwell House was considered one of Chafee's significant foundational works, alongside the Viewpoint House, Ramada House and Jacobson House.
