= J. Christopher Ackerley =

American politician

Member of the Arizona House of Representatives from the 2nd district
- In office January 5, 2015 – January 9, 2017 Serving with Rosanna Gabaldón
- Preceded by: Demion Clinco
- Succeeded by: Daniel Hernández Jr.

Personal details
- Party: Republican
- Education: Northern Arizona University
- Profession: High School Teacher
- Website: chrisackerley.com

J. Christopher Ackerley is an American politician and a former Republican member of the Arizona House of Representatives who represented District 2.

== Education ==
Ackerley earned his degree from Northern Arizona University. He currently teaches high school physics and math at Amphitheater High School in Tucson.

== Elections ==
- 2018 Ackerley and fellow Republican Anthony Sizer were defeated by Democratic incumbents Hernández and Gabaldon in the general election.
- 2016 Ackerley was defeated by Daniel Hernández Jr. and Democratic incumbent Rosanna Gabaldon in the general election.
- 2014 Ackerley ran unopposed in the Republican primary. Ackerley came in second behind Rosanna Gabaldón and ahead of Democratic incumbent Demion Clinco in the general election with 19,656 votes.
- 2012 Ackerley ran unopposed in the Republican primary. Ackerley came in third in the general election with 23,677 votes.
