= Bright Lights of Broadway =

1923 film

- German poster
- Directed by: Webster Campbell
- Written by: Edmund Goulding
- Story by: Gerald C. Duffy
- Produced by: B. F. Zeidman
- Starring: Doris Kenyon; Lowell Sherman
- Distributed by: Principal Pictures Corporation
- Release date: August 6, 1923
- Running time: 7 reels
- Country: United States
- Language: Silent (English intertitles)

Bright Lights of Broadway is a surviving 1923 American silent drama film directed by Webster Campbell. An independent film it stars Doris Kenyon, Harrison Ford, and Lowell Sherman.

A print of Bright Lights of Broadway survives with the Library of Congress.

== Cast ==
- Doris Kenyon as Irene Marley
- Harrison Ford as Thomas Drake
- Edmund Breese as Reverend Graham Drake
- Claire de Lorez as Connie King
- Lowell Sherman as Randall Sherrill
- Charles Murray as El Jumbo
- Effie Shannon as Mrs. Grimm, Landlady
- Tyrone Power as John Kirk
