= Morgane, the Enchantress =

1928 film

- Directed by: Léonce Perret
- Written by: Léonce Perret; Charles Le Goffic (novel)
- Produced by: Léonce Perret
- Starring: Claire de Lorez; Iván Petrovich; Pierre Renoir
- Cinematography: Léonce-Henri Burel; René Colas; Georges Lucas; Giovanni Ventimiglia
- Production company: Franco Films
- Distributed by: Franco Films
- Release date: 2 March 1928
- Running time: 90 minutes
- Country: France
- Languages: Silent; French intertitles

Morgane, the Enchantress (French: Morgane la sirène) is a 1928 French silent drama film directed by Léonce Perret and starring Claire de Lorez, Iván Petrovich and Pierre Renoir. It was shot at the Victorine Studios in Nice. The film's sets were designed by the art director Jacques-Laurent Atthalin. The future British director Michael Powell worked as a still photographer on the film.

== Cast ==
- Claire de Lorez as Morgane
- Iván Petrovich as Georges de Kerduel
- Josyane as Annette Le Foulon
- Georges Charlia
- Damorès as Le Foulon - Bankier
- Flore Deschamps
- Rachel Devirys as Madame Le Foulon
- Félix Dupont
- André Liabel
- Alexandre Mathillon
- Pierre Renoir
- Alice Tissot
- Georges Térof

== Bibliography ==
- Rège, Philippe. Encyclopedia of French Film Directors, Volume 1. Scarecrow Press, 2009.
