= Foothills Mall (Arizona) =

Shopping mall near Tucson, Arizona, US

- Location: Tucson, Arizona, postal address, United States
- Coordinates: 32°20′26″N 111°00′54″W
- Address: 7401 North La Cholla Boulevard
- Opened: 1982; 44 years ago
- Closed: 2023; 3 years ago
- Developer: Federated Stores Realty
- Owner: Bourn Companites
- Num. of stores: 38 stores and outlets
- Num. of anchor tenants: 1
- Floor area: 700,000 square feet (65,000 m^{2}) (GLA)
- Floors: 1
- Website: shopfoothillsmall.com

Foothills Mall was an indoor regional shopping mall located in Casas Adobes, Arizona, United States, with a Tucson postal address. Foothills Mall had capacity for over 90 stores and outlets, along with 8 restaurants and an AMC Theatres Foothills 15. As of 2023, the mall has been demolished, with plans to convert the existing mall into a mixed-use project.

== History ==
Opened in 1982 as a small upscale mall, Foothills Mall originally including Goldwater's (102,939 ft.^{2}) and Levy's (103,429 ft.^{2}) as its anchors, as well as the Plitt Foothills 4 Cinemas. In 1985, Levy's became Sanger-Harris and in 1987, Foley's. In 1988, Foothills 4 Cinemas became Cineplex Odeon Foothills 7 Cinemas while Goldwater's became Dillard's in 1989. Both Dillard's and Foley's closed in 1994, as they were overlapped at nearby Tucson Mall.

By the mid-1990s, Foothills Mall was finding little support for its upscale niche and was largely vacant. The mall was re-tenanted as an ancillary/outlet oriented mall, with Barnes & Noble and Saks Fifth Avenue's Off Fifth outlet opening in the former Dillard's space. Meanwhile, a Ross Dress for Less, Linens ‘N’ Things, and Nike Factory Store moved into the former Foley's, and the Cineplex Odeon Foothills 7 Cinemas was given 8 new screens. A standalone Walmart Supercenter was also added in the mid-1990s, as well as new stores on the perimeter of the property. The Cineplex Odeon Foothills 15 Cinemas became Loews Cineplex Foothills 15 Theatres in 1998, and AMC Loews Foothills 15 Theatres in 2005. In 1999 Bourn Companies sold Foothills Mall

After nearly two decades of experiencing success with the outlet mall concept, Foothills Mall faced difficulty in 2016 retaining tenants after the opening of the Tucson Premium Outlets in nearby Marana. Within six months of the outdoor mall opening, major tenants Saks Fifth Avenue's Off Fifth outlet, Old Navy's Outlet, Hanes and Nike Factory Store closed or announced plans to close their existing Foothills Mall locations in favor of a store at Tucson Premium Outlets. Bourn Companies purchased Foothills Mall again in 2016. In 2018, Foothills Mall received a zoning change that permitted mixed use developments

In 2021, the mall walled off the section from Barnes & Noble to the food court.

As of 2023, the mall is undergoing partial demolition, with plans to convert the mall into a mixed-use project, Uptown. Tenants including Bath & Body Works, Barnes & Noble, and a 15-screen AMC Loews Theaters / IMAX Theater, alongside Applebee's, Outback Steakhouse, and other businesses on the perimeter of the mall will remain open.

Bourn Companies is calling the redeveloped land "Uptown" and revealed renderings on May 15, 2023.
