= Goldwater's =

Former business in Phoenix, Arizona

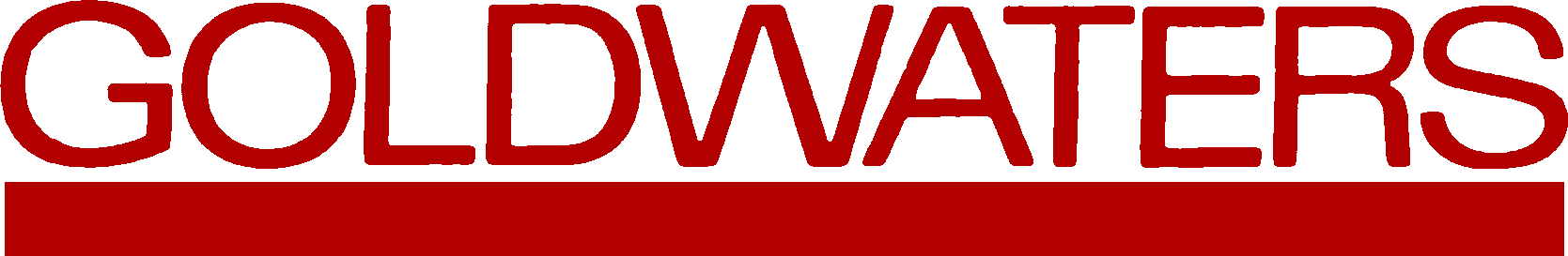

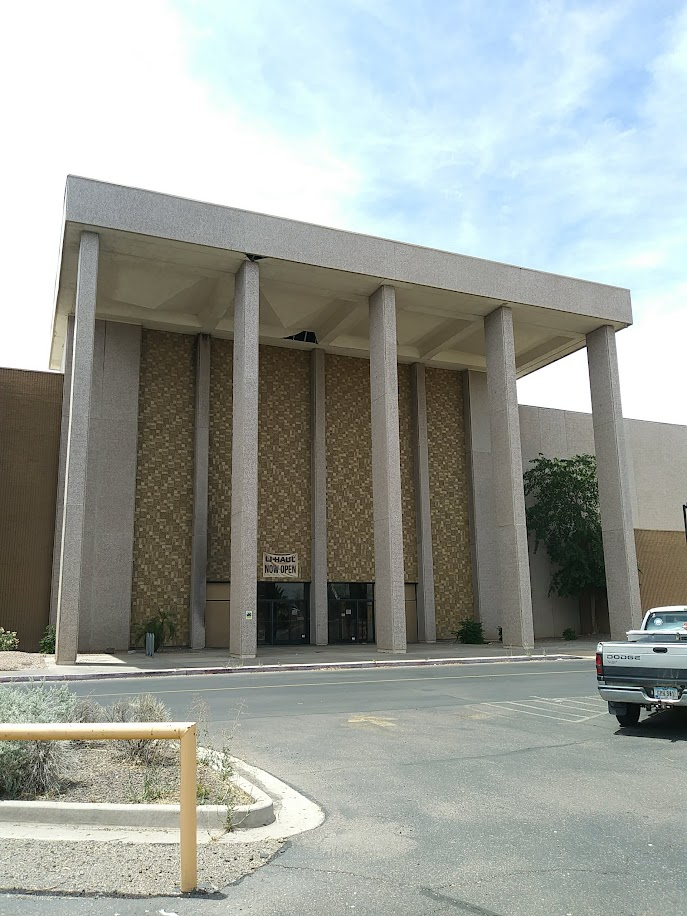
- Former Goldwater's at Metrocenter Mall, June 2021
- Industry: Retail
- Founded: 1860
- Founder: Michael Goldwater
- Defunct: 1989
- Headquarters: Phoenix, Arizona, U.S.
- Area served: Arizona, New Mexico, Nevada, U.S.
- Key people: Michael Goldwater, Baron Goldwater, Morris Goldwater, Robert W. Goldwater
- Products: Clothing, footwear, furniture, jewelry, bedding and beauty products
- Parent: Associated Dry Goods (1963-1986), May Department Stores (1986-1989)

Goldwater's Department Store was a department store chain based in Phoenix, Arizona.

== History ==
Michael Goldwater, a Polish Jewish immigrant and the grandfather of U.S. Senator and 1964 presidential candidate Barry Goldwater, established a trading post in 1860 in Gila City, Arizona Territory. In 1872, he moved to Phoenix where he opened a new store. The Phoenix store did poorly and was closed a short time later. After this failed venture, he opened M. Goldwater & Bros. Store in Prescott, which did well. In 1892, the Phoenix store was reopened under the management of Michael's son Baron Goldwater and performed well. Baron managed the chain along with his two brothers Henry and Morris. Baron's son Robert W. Goldwater went on to manage the chain and during this time Goldwater's expanded to open a store at Park Central in 1956. This was followed by the opening of the flagship store at Scottsdale Fashion Square in 1961.

Associated Dry Goods Corp. acquired Goldwater's in 1962 with Robert W. Goldwater serving as director and vice president. Associated expanded it to nine stores in the following decades, establishing stores in Tucson, Albuquerque and Las Vegas markets. In 1986, May Department Stores acquired Associated and in 1989 it dissolved the Goldwater's division. Seven of its stores were rebranded as parts of the J. W. Robinson's, May Company California and May D&F divisions. At this time, May sold the Tucson stores to Dillard's because of overlap with its recently acquired Foley's unit. May Department Stores merged its May Company California and J. W. Robinson's divisions in 1993 as Robinsons-May, reuniting the Phoenix and Las Vegas stores under one nameplate while the May Department Stores unit in New Mexico became Foley's. Following the Federated Department Stores purchase of May in 2006, several of the remaining former Goldwater's locations became Macy's, while the former flagship location at Scottsdale Fashion Square was demolished to make way for Barneys New York, which itself closed in 2016.

The Goldwater family reclaimed the store's old logo in 1989 and reincarnated it as a food company called Goldwater's Foods and now headed by Goldwater's granddaughter Carolyn Goldwater Ross.

== Locations ==
Goldwater's locations included:

- Noble Building, Phoenix (opened 1910, closed April 1, 1960)
- Cortez & Union Streets, Prescott (opened September 18, 1937)
- Park Central Mall, Phoenix (opened November 8, 1956)
- Scottsdale Fashion Square, Scottsdale (opened October 9, 1961)
- Metrocenter Mall, Phoenix (opened October 21, 1973)
- Coronado Center, Albuquerque (opened February 16, 1976)
- El Con Center, Tucson (opened August 14, 1978)
- Fiesta Mall, Mesa (opened August 13, 1979)
- Paradise Valley Mall, Phoenix (opened August 11, 1980)
- Fashion Show Mall, Las Vegas (opened February 14, 1981)
- Foothills Mall, Tucson (opened August 4, 1982)

== See also ==
- List of department stores converted to Macy's
- List of defunct department stores of the United States
