= Northern Code =

1925 film

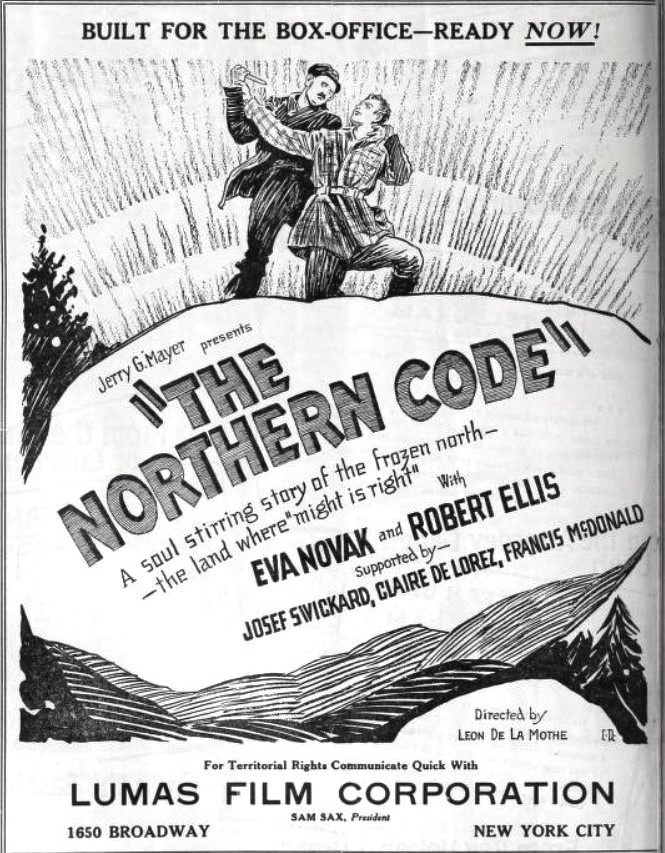
- Advertisement
- Directed by: Leon De La Mothe
- Written by: Everett C. Maxwell; Camille Fox
- Produced by: Jerry G. Mayer
- Starring: Robert Ellis; Eva Novak; Josef Swickard
- Cinematography: Bert Baldridge; Donald Parker
- Production company: Gotham Pictures
- Distributed by: Lumas Film Corporation
- Release date: October 13, 1925
- Running time: 60 minutes
- Country: United States
- Language: Silent (English intertitles)

Northern Code (also written as The Northern Code) is a 1925 American silent Northern romantic drama film directed by Leon De La Mothe and starring Robert Ellis, Eva Novak, and Josef Swickard.

== Plot ==
As described in a film magazine review, drunken Raoul La Fane, a Canadian trapper, attacks his young wife Marie. She fires a revolver at him and he falls. Fearing arrest for murder, Marie flees into the snow wilderness. Louis Le Blanc aids her and, after she finds that he truly loves her and supposing her brutal husband dead, she weds him. Later, Raoul appears, and Marie tells Louis her secret. Louis follows Raoul and, in the fight that follows, Raoul dies after falling over a cliff. Louis returns to Marie and informs her that there is no longer any bar to their future happiness.

== Cast ==
- Robert Ellis as Louis Le Blanc
- Eva Novak as Marie La Fane
- Francis McDonald as Raoul La Fane
- Josef Swickard as Père Le Blanc
- Jack Kenny as Pierre De Val, Canuk Trapper
- Claire de Lorez as Señorita Anita Mendez
- Raye Hampton as Mama Le Blanc
- Edward W. Borman as Frank Clements, Proprietor

== Bibliography ==
- Connelly, Robert B. The Silents: Silent Feature Films, 1910-36, Volume 40, Issue 2. December Press, 1998.
- Munden, Kenneth White. The American Film Institute Catalog of Motion Pictures Produced in the United States, Part 1. University of California Press, 1997.
