= Ramada House =

- Jane Solomon House
- Interactive map of the Ramada House area

General information
- Architectural style: Brutalism, Critical Regionalism
- Location: Tucson, Pima County, Arizona, United States
- Coordinates: 32.3055°N 110.9297°W
- Construction started: 1973
- Completed: 1975
- Client: Jane (Solomon) London

Technical details
- Structural system: Concrete block and wood post and beam
- Floor area: about 3,800 square feet (350 m^{2})

Design and construction
- Architect: Judith Chafee

U.S. National Register of Historic Places
- Official name: Ramada House
- Designated: September 24, 2006
- Reference no.: 06000832

The Ramada House is a 3,800 square-foot residence located in the Catalina Foothills area of Tucson, Arizona. Designed by architect Judith Chafee in 1973, and completed in 1975, the house combines modernist-inspired design with traditional O'odham shade structures to create a unique living space that exemplifies the tenets of critical regionalism. The property was listed on the National Register of Historic Places in 2006.

== Design and construction ==
The Ramada House was designed by Judith Chafee, FAIA (1932-1998), an architect considered a master for her contributions to architecture nationally and internationally. The design of the house began in 1973 and construction was completed in 1975.

The modernist-inspired floor plan of the Ramada House combines the formal grid of the ramada support posts with the more fluid white masonry walls of the house below it. The entrance is located on the middle level, as is the living room and small outdoor court. This courtyard space is not functional and allows more natural light to come into the living room and entrance hall. The living room is set at an angle and juts out of the house with a full-height bay window that lets the viewer step into the view. This is repeated in a bay window next to the main entrance, facing south. On the upper level is the master bedroom, including a dressing room and bath, and library, while the lower level contains the dining and family rooms, kitchen, and spare bedroom. The kitchen, family room, and living room have access to an exterior covered deck that leads to a swimming pool and a small garden. The second story consists of two bedrooms and a wooden roof deck constructed of 1"x 4" pinewood. The principal rooms of the house face north to capture the spectacular views of the foothills and mountains.

The house is oriented east–west on three levels, following the slope of the site. The entrance is located on the middle level, along with the living room and a small outdoor courtyard. The upper level contains the master bedroom, dressing room, and library, while the lower level features the dining and family rooms, kitchen, and spare bedroom. The principal rooms of the house face north, offering stunning views of the surrounding foothills and mountains.

The entire house is shaded by a massive ramada, constructed of 20 round vertical poles, horizontal beams, and a lattice of closely-spaced timbers. Positioned to filter the light falling on the southern entry facade, the ramada responds to seasonal changes in the position of the sun, providing protection from the high summer sun and welcoming in the rays of the low winter sun. The elevated shade structure also channels the natural foothills breeze between the ramada and the house, thus reducing the building's heat load.

The walls of the Ramada House are made of slump block covered with mortar wash and white paint, resembling adobe. The roof is constructed of wood joists covered with composite asphalt. The floors on the ground levels are a combination of concrete slab with carpeting and concrete tile. The floors of the second-floor bedrooms, along with the stairway, are sheathed in yellow pine. Exposed wooden lintels are located above the doors and windows.

== The Ramada ==
The entire house is shaded by an enormous ramada, 26' tall on the south facade and laid out in a formal 20' grid, from which the house is named. The ramada is constructed of 20 round vertical poles, horizontal beams, and a lattice of closely-spaced 2" x 4" timbers, all pressure-treated Douglas fir. The ramada is positioned to filter the light falling on the southern entry facade and responds to seasonal changes in the position of the sun, providing protection from the high summer sun and welcoming in the rays of the low winter sun. As in its traditional use, the elevated shade structure of the ramada also channels the natural foothills breeze between the ramada and the house, thus reducing the building's heat load. The posts pierce the house and are incorporated into the living areas, providing a continuous internal reference to the exterior structure.

== Judith Chafee ==
Judith Chafee (1932–1998) was an American architect and educator who made significant contributions to the architecture of the American Southwest. Chafee was born in Chicago, Illinois. Chafee attended Francis W. Parker School, before matriculating into Bennington College in Bennington, Vermont, graduating with a major in visual arts in 1954. In 1956 she enrolled in Yale University's Graduate School of Arts and Architecture (Yale School of Architecture) and was the only woman to graduate from her class.

She went on to work for nationally recognized architectural firms including, Paul Rudolph on the development of projects including the Yale University Art and Architecture Building and Married Student Housing and later job captain for residential projects in Baltimore. In 1962 she accepted a position with Walter Gropius' The Architects Collaborative (TAC) and worked on education projects for education projects for Brandeis University and Radcliffe College. After a year in Cambridge, Massachusetts, she accepted a position with Eero Saarinen and Associates in Connecticut where she worked on projects including Cummings Diesel in Darlington England and the international terminal for the TWA Flight Center at John F. Kennedy Airport. She then worked for five years at the Edward Larrabee Barnes Office in New Haven and ran a small private practice.

In 1969 Chafee moved back to Tucson and opened her own practice. Chafee taught at the University of Arizona from 1975 until her death in 1998. She was awarded the American Institute of Architects (AIA) Arizona's Lifetime Achievement Award posthumously in 2002.

== Comparison to Chafee's other major works ==
The Ramada House is considered one of Chafee's significant foundational works, alongside the Viewpoint House, Jacobson House, and the demolished Jerry Blackwell House.

== Recognition and legacy ==
The Ramada House is significant for its association with architect Judith Chafee, who is considered a master for her contributions to architecture nationally and internationally. It is also considered an iconic exemplar of critical regionalism, a movement that synthesized European modernist intentions with the cultural, geographic, and climatic concerns of a particular place.
