= The Desert Hawk (1924 film) =

1924 film

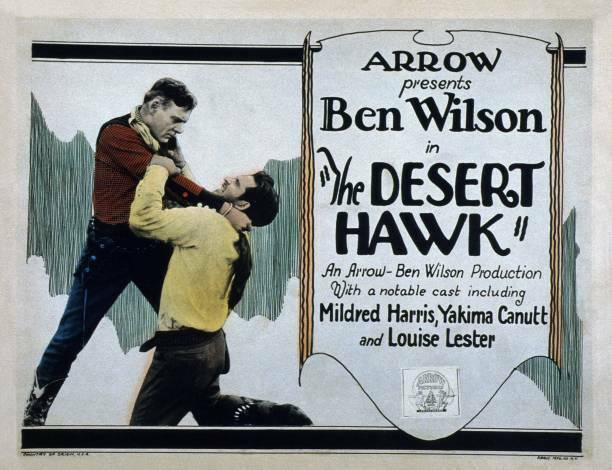
- Directed by: Leon De La Mothe
- Written by: Jay Inman Kane; Robert McKenzie; Daniel F. Whitcomb
- Produced by: Ben F. Wilson
- Starring: Ben F. Wilson; Mildred Harris; Louise Lester
- Production companies: Ben Wilson Productions; Berwilla Film Corporation
- Distributed by: Arrow Film Corporation
- Release date: October 25, 1924
- Running time: 50 minutes
- Country: United States
- Languages: Silent; English intertitles

The Desert Hawk is a 1924 American silent Western film directed by Leon De La Mothe and starring Ben F. Wilson, Mildred Harris and Louise Lester. It was released by the independent company Arrow Pictures.

== Synopsis ==
Hawk Hollister, wrongly wanted for killing the sheriff's brother, comes to the aid of Marie Nicholls when she encounters a gang trying to steal the inheritance left to her by her uncle.

== Cast ==
- Ben F. Wilson as Hawk Hollister
- Mildred Harris as Marie Nicholls
- William Bailey as Tex Trapp
- Louise Lester as Bridget
- Yakima Canutt as Handy Man
- Ed La Niece as Sheriff Carson
- Leon De La Mothe as Sheriff Jackson
- Helen Broneau as Mercedes Nicholls

== Preservation ==
The picture is now lost.

== Bibliography ==
- Connelly, Robert B. The Silents: Silent Feature Films, 1910-36, Volume 40, Issue 2. December Press, 1998.
- Munden, Kenneth White. The American Film Institute Catalog of Motion Pictures Produced in the United States, Part 1. University of California Press, 1997.
