= Ridin' Wild (1925 film) =

1925 film

- Directed by: Leon De La Mothe
- Written by: Robert J. Horner; Matilda Smit
- Produced by: Robert J. Horner
- Starring: William Barrymore
- Cinematography: Jack Draper
- Production company: Robert J. Horner Productions
- Distributed by: Aywon Film Corporation
- Release date: 1925
- Running time: 60 minutes
- Country: United States
- Languages: Silent; English intertitles

Ridin' Wild is a 1925 American silent Western film directed by Leon De La Mothe a written by Robert J. Horner and Matilda Smith featuring William Barrymore. The film was shot on location in Tucson, Arizona in 1924. An 8mm print of the Film was acquired by the Tucson Historic Preservation Foundation and digitized and restored in 2011. The film features the first 1924 Tucson Winter Rodeo: La Fiesta de los Vaqueros.

This Western starred William Barrymore who, despite his intentionally misleading surname, was not a member of the great acting clan. He was, in fact, Elia Bulakh, a former Cossack soldier in the army of Czar Nicholas II who had escaped execution during the revolution of 1917 by using the lid of a can of beef (which was supposed to be his last meal) to slit the throat of his executioner and escape from Russia to the United States via China.

== Plot ==
Ridin' Wild (1925)

Kit Carson travels to Tucson thinking the desert air will help his health. After accidentally meeting cowboy Jack Richardson he learns the ways of the west. But after meeting Pauline Curley, Kit hears of Richardson's evil ways. With high stakes in the upcoming Tucson rodeo, Richardson kidnaps Kit to prevent him from competing. This 1925 silent western showcases Tucson and the surrounding area in remarkable detail. A surviving print of the film was tracked down by historian Demion Clinco, acquired and digitized by the Tucson Historic Preservation Foundation Live piano accompaniment in conjunction with the Tucson Jazz Festival thanks to Jeff Haskell. The film was screened in 2016 as part of the Tucson Film Fest with live musical accompaniment.

== Cast ==
- William Barrymore as Jim Warren (As Kit Carson)
- Pauline Curley as Betty Blake
- Jack Richardson as Scarface Jordan
- Jack Walker as George Berge
- Walter Maly as Sheriff Fred Blake
- C.L. James as Red Hanson
- Robert J. Horner Producer
- Jack Draper Cinematography
- Nathan Hirsh Presenter and co-producer
