= Claire de Lorez =

American film actress

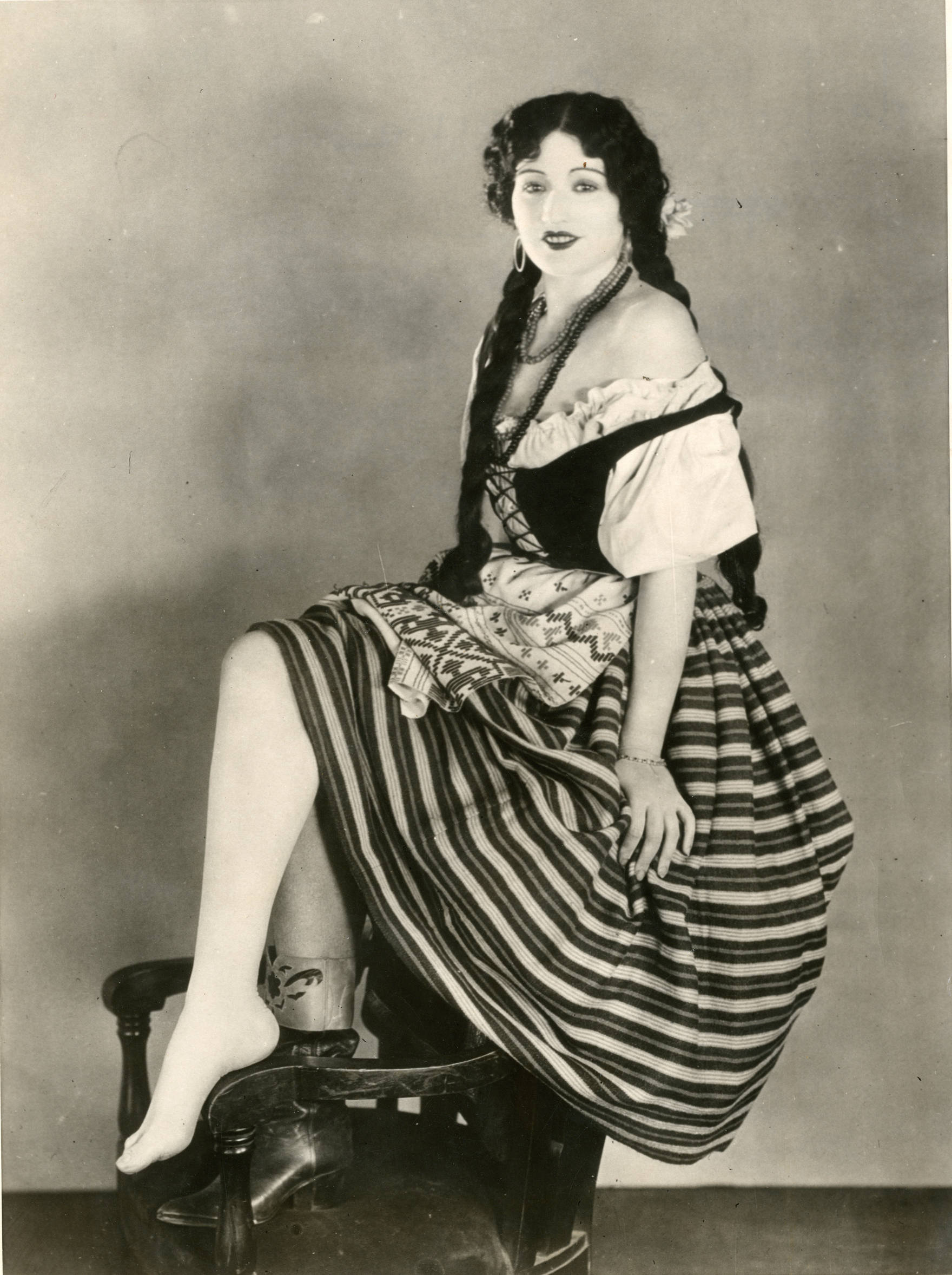
- Still from Three Weeks (1924)
- Born: Claire Deutch; August 4, 1895; San Francisco, California, United States
- Died: September 21, 1985 (aged 90); San Francisco, California, United States
- Occupation: Actress
- Years active: 1920-1928 (film)

Claire de Lorez (born Claire Deutch; August 4, 1895 – September 21, 1985), also billed as Claire DeLorez, was an American film actress of the silent era.

== Early life ==
Born in San Francisco, de Lorez was one of three children born to Eliza G. McMahon and Isaac "Ike" Deutch. Her sister, Thelma, was a dancer who also used the stage name DeLorez.

As early as age 4, de Lorez—as Claire Deutch—was performing in public as a singer and dancer. Appearing both alone and with her brother Edward, Deutch was dubbed "one of the coming vaudeville stars" by The San Francisco Examiner.

== Career ==
Specializing in vamp roles, de Lorez was active in Hollywood films from 1920 to 1925, after which she went to Paris and performed on stage there in addition to starring in at least five films.

During World War I de Lorez served with an American ambulance unit; in World War II she was interned by Germans at Vittel. She married a man from a wealthy Greek family and became known as Claire Typaldon-Bassian. In 1949 she was secretary of an American Legion post's women's auxiliary in Paris.

In September 1932 de Lorez swallowed pills in a cafe in Paris in an attempt to kill herself. A waiter who saw the act prevented her from drinking water, hoping that would slow the spread of the poison. The Los Angeles Times reported that de Lorez was "suddenly desperate because of her socially and politically distinguished fiance's declaration that he would not marry her".

== Partial filmography ==
- The Scuttlers (1920)
- The Four Horsemen of the Apocalypse (1921)
- The Queen of Sheba (1921)
- Enemies of Women (1923)
- Bright Lights of Broadway (1923)
- Three Weeks (1924)
- Beau Brummel (1924)
- The Siren of Seville (1924)
- Her Night of Romance (1924)
- So This Is Marriage (1924)
- The Re-Creation of Brian Kent (1925)
- The Coast Patrol (1925)
- Under the Rouge (1925)
- Northern Code (1925)
- Cobra (1925)
- The Crew (1928)
- Morgane, the Enchantress (1928)

== Bibliography ==
- Goble, Alan. The Complete Index to Literary Sources in Film. Walter de Gruyter, 1999.
