= El Con Center =

Shopping mall in Tucson, Arizona, US

Coordinates: 32°13′26″N 110°55′00″W

- Location: 3601 E. Broadway Boulevard; Tucson, Arizona, U.S.
- Opened: 1960
- Closed: 2011 (original indoor mall)
- Demolished: September 21, 2011
- Developer: Joseph Kivel and the Papanikolas brothers
- Owner: Stan Kroenke
- Num. of stores: 20
- Num. of anchor tenants: 7 (6 open, 1 vacant)
- Floor area: 1,200,000 square feet (110,000 m^{2}) (GLA)
- Floors: 1

El Con Center is an open-air shopping mall in the city of Tucson, Arizona, United States anchored by Cinemark Theatres, Target, The Home Depot, Walmart, Ross (30,220 ft.^{2}), Burlington (65,680 ft.^{2}), and Marshalls. There is 1 vacant anchor store that was once JCPenney. The oldest mall in metropolitan Tucson, El Con Mall, as it was known since its opening in 1960, was renamed in May 2014 at the time of its sale for $81.7 million to Stan Kroenke, owner of numerous sports properties including Arsenal F.C. and the Los Angeles Rams.

== History ==
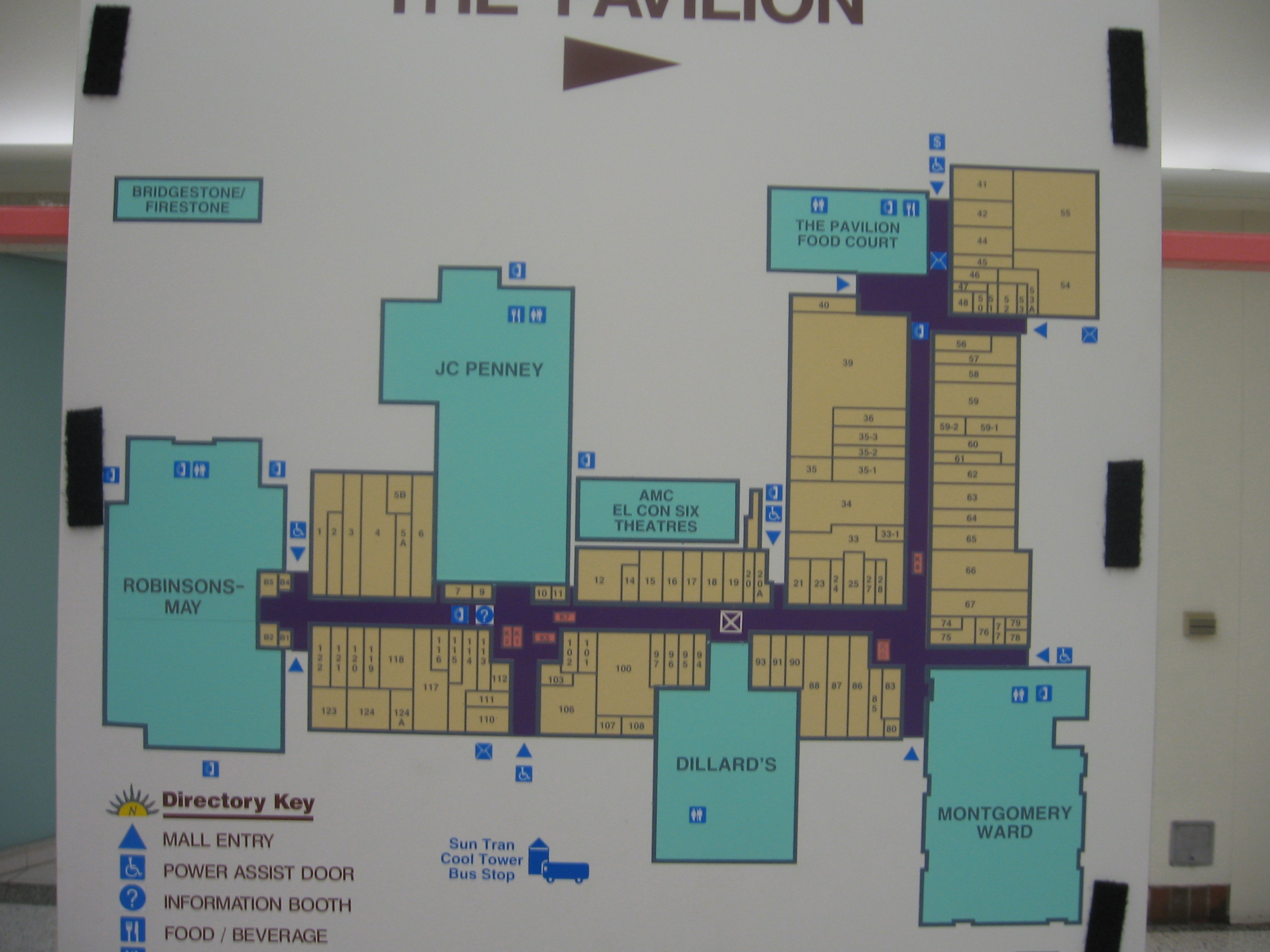
1990s El Con Mall directory map

El Con Mall opened in 1960–61 as the first mall in Tucson, Arizona, adjacent to the El Conquistador Hotel. Although initial plans called for the hotel to be part of the mall itself, these plans were later scrapped. An outdoor mall at the time of its opening (consisting of Stores #21–79 and 2 anchor spaces), El Con Mall was anchored by the local department store Levy’s, and chain stores Montgomery Ward (February 2, 1961), Skaggs Drug Centers, Kresge’s, El Rancho Market, and Woolworth. Other tenants included House Of Fabrics, The College Shop, Mills-Touché, Lerner Shops, Kinney Shoes, El Con Cocktail Lounge, First National Bank Of Arizona, Daniel’s Credit Jewelers, Sandy’s Fashions, & Cele Peterson’s In 1967, the former El Conquistador Hotel space was demolished, and a new Levy’s store (opening on September 16, 1969), a J. C. Penney (1971), Stores #1–11, #101–106, & #110–124A & some mall space were built on the site, & east of it. Steinfeld’s moved from its historic 35 North Stone Avenue downtown location into Levy’s former store at the shopping center’s original portion’s NW corner. A new Goldwater’s (August 14, 1978) store and a 6-screen movie theatre (operated by AMC Theatres as early as January 1988) were built along a connecting link with stores #12–20A, & #80–100, and the entire shopping center was enclosed. Joseph Kivel and the Papanikolas brothers developed the El Con Mall. Joseph Kivel later opened another shopping mall, what is now Park Place, in 1975. After his death in 1995, his interest in both malls was left to his two sons. In 1996, Park Mall was sold to General Growth Properties.

Skaggs Drug Centers was eventually bought out by Osco Drug no earlier than May 30, 1983, and no later than March 13, 1995. Steinfeld’s closed, and became a winter-time-only soup kitchen in 1984, & the Pavilion Food Court in 1993. Levy’s (which was owned by Federated Department Stores, Inc.) became Sanger-Harris in 1985, marking the first of several name changes in the mall's western anchor store. Sanger-Harris became Foley’s in 1987, and Robinsons-May February 2, 1997. Goldwater's, in turn, became Dillard's in 1989. The El Con location of Montgomery Ward’s closed in mid 2001. On June 4, 2020, it was announced that JCPenney will be closing around October 2020 as part of a plan to close 154 stores nationwide. After JCPenney closed, The Home Depot, Target, Burlington, Marshalls, Ross Dress for Less, and Walmart became the remaining anchor stores left.

== Renovations ==
Until the 2014 sale to Stan Kroenke, El Con Mall was still owned by the heirs of its original developers, Joseph Kivel and the Papanikolas brothers. Following the elder Kivel's demise in 1995, and the deaths of the Papanikolas brothers, their descendants began renovations on the mall. In mid-1998 the entire original wing (save Montgomery Ward), the mall space between Wards & the original wing, and the AMC El Con 6 Theatres (the latter of which had closed on September 1, 1997) were demolished, forcing Osco Drug to move from Store #54 to Store #123 and lose its status as an anchor. Subsequently, the Century El Con 20 Theatres (which became the Cinemark El Con 20 Theatres in 2006) was built on some removed parking space north of the eastern part of the original theatres and a food court was built on the sites of the western part of the original theatres and all of stores #12, 14 and 15, although no restaurants were ever opened in the food court. Additional plans promised "a unique variety of retail stores", but competition from larger malls, most notably Park Place, caused El Con to lose more stores than it gained. Dillard's closed on May 9, 2000. It had decided to when Park Mall’s Dillard’s got a new building. Montgomery Ward was renamed Wards in 1997.

On March 18, 2001, Montgomery Ward closed along with the company's bankruptcy. The Home Depot (2001) and Target (2003) were built on the east side of the mall, with the latter replacing Wards, Stores #80, #83, & #85, some mall space, as well as some parking space, and the former occupying part of the site of the demolished northeastern wing. The addition of these stores was considered controversial by local residents, many of whom did not want such big box retailers in the area. Neither Target nor The Home Depot was ever directly accessible from within the mall itself. The El Con Mall sign was also removed around this time.

Although many retailers and restaurants opened on the mall's periphery in the 2000s, the enclosed mall itself continued to lose tenants. In 2005, May Department Stores (then owners of the Robinsons-May name) was acquired by Macy's, Inc., who absorbed every one of May Department Stores’ subsidiaries into Macy's in the following year. The Macy's store in El Con Mall was deemed unprofitable, and closed on February 29, 2008, shortly after the addition of a Ross Dress For Less store at part of the site previously occupied by the then recently demolished stores #110–124A. Later in 2008, it was announced that Walmart might move into the former Macy's building. Instead, Walmart built a new building, though, by municipal order, it was in the footprint of the old Macy's. In November 2009, Burlington Coat Factory announced it would open a new store at El Con Mall in the former Dillard's space.

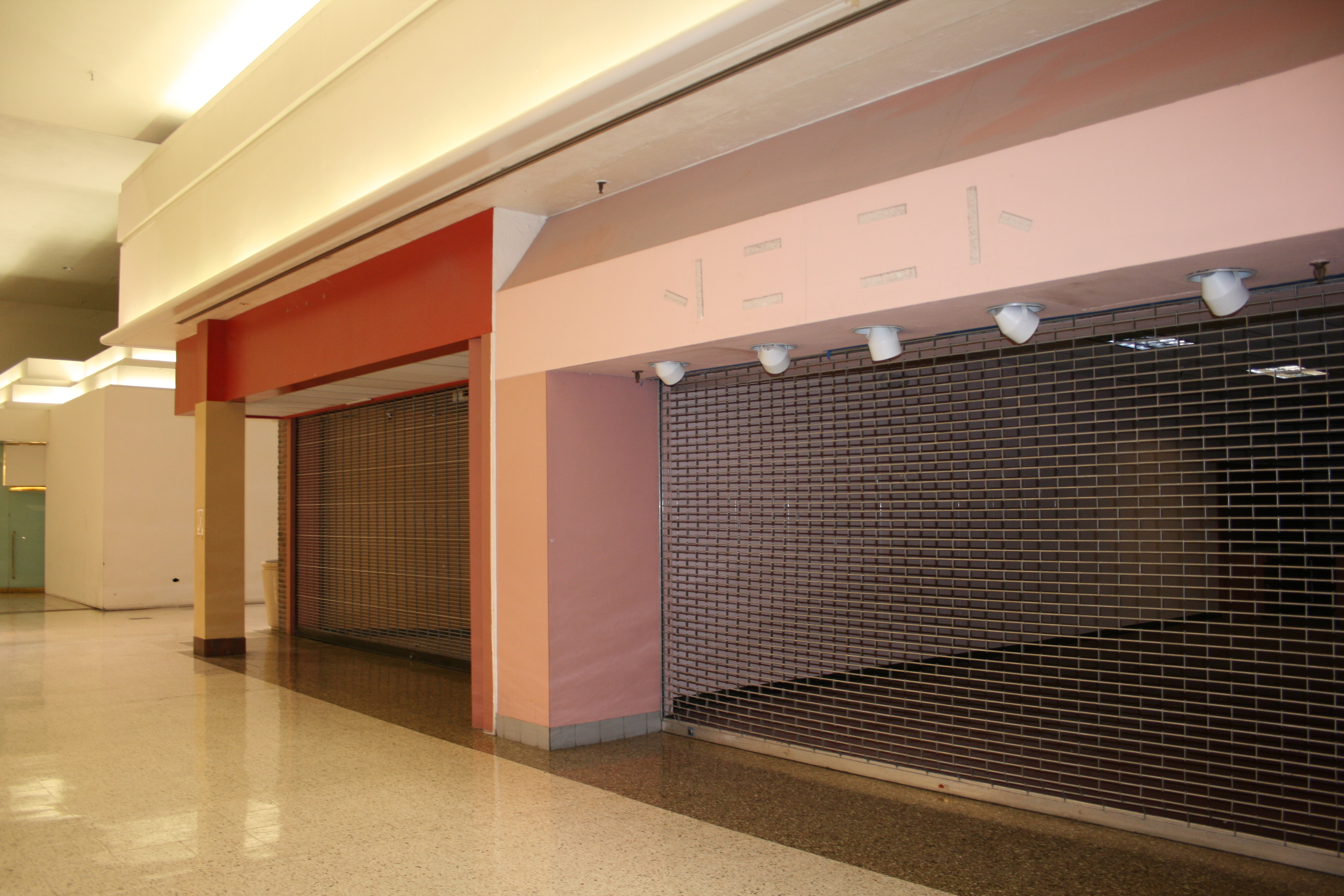
El Con vacant storefronts

The store opened on March 5, 2010. As of September 21, 2011 the mall space and all store spaces (except stores #1–6) were demolished and a pathway was built for access. Montgomery Ward's Tucson location was in operation until mid-2001. In 2012 the El Con Mall sign was reinstalled. The store was vacated and liquidated in the Chapter 11 bankruptcy proceedings. The existing lease rights were purchased by the "Target" Federated Department Store Group – much to the chagrin of the existing ownership team.
