= Leon De La Mothe =

American film director

- Born: Leon Kent; December 26, 1880; New Orleans, Louisiana
- Died: June 12, 1943 (aged 62); Los Angeles, California
- Occupations: Film director Actor; Screenwriter
- Years active: 1915-1928

Leon De La Mothe (born Louis Kent; December 26, 1880 – June 12, 1943) was an American film director, actor and screenwriter of the silent era. He directed 40 films between 1915 and 1925. He also appeared in 28 films between 1915 and 1928. He was born in New Orleans, Louisiana and died in Los Angeles, California.

== Selected filmography ==
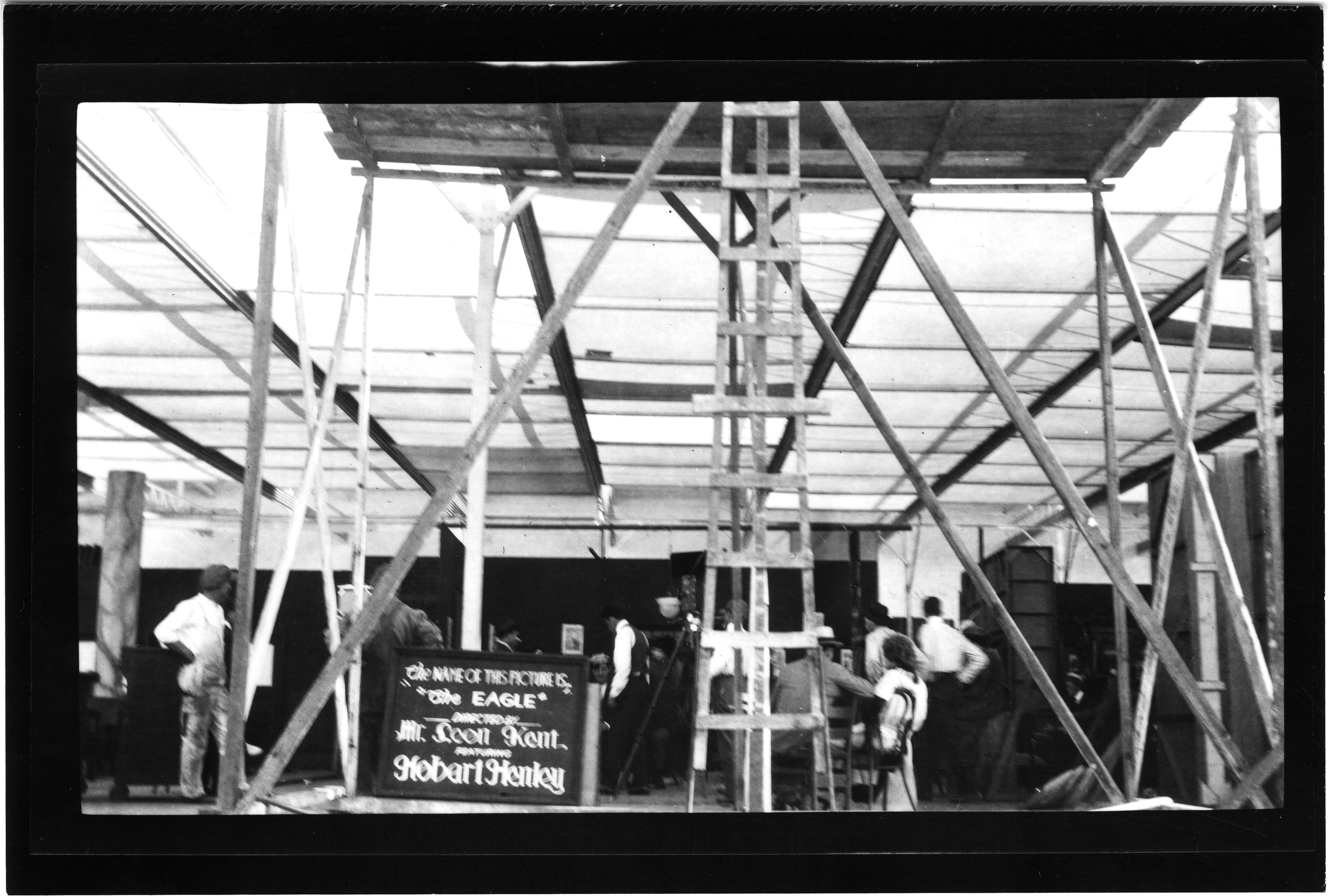
Photograph of the set of the Universal Pictures short film The Eagle in 1915, with director De La Mothe credited as Leon Kent

- The Eagle (1915)
- The Magnificent Meddler (1917)
- By Right of Possession (1917)
- The Spotted Lily (1917)
- Heart of the Sunset (1918)
- Play Straight or Fight (1918)
- Her Moment (1918)
- Riddle Gawne (1918)
- The Red Glove (1919)
- Vanishing Trails (1920)
- Ten Scars Make a Man (1924)
- The Desert Hawk (1924)
- Pals (1925)
- Northern Code (1925)
- Ridin' Wild (1925)
- The Road Agent (1926)
- The Lost Trail (1926)
- The Painted Trail (1928)
- Trail Riders (1928)
- Trailin' Back (1928)
