= Alexis Romm =

Entrepreneur, builder, real-estate developer, art collector

- Born: April 19, 1877; Russia
- Died: September 25, 1928 (aged 51); Manhattan, New York, U.S.
- Occupations: Entrepreneur, Builder, Real Estate Developer, Art Collector
- Spouse: May Romm (m. 1928)
- Writing career
- Years active: 1920-1928

Alexis Romm (April 19, 1877 – September 25, 1928) was a Russian-born Jewish, American, New York City, Bronx, and Mount Vernon based entrepreneur, builder, real estate developer, and art collector. Through his multiple companies and enterprises he constructed numerous multi-story apartment buildings. His dramatic suicide, after a cancer diagnosis, and subsequent estate settlement was widely written about and published in newspapers across the United States.

== Personal life and marriages ==
Alexis Romm, was born on April 19, 1877, in Russia. He immigrated to the United States and married Bella Usiskin who had migrated to the United States in 1902 at age 23. The couple had three children, Serge (Sergus) Romm (1903–1933), Emil Romm (1904–1965) and Martha Romm (Clinco) (1914–1978). Romm was a prominent member of New York's Jewish Community, his son Emil Romm married Isabel Levine, the daughter of Russian born Jewish American Lawyer and Judge Max S. Levine in 1929. Martha Clinco married prominent Italian-American Hollywood Psychoanalyst Arthur Clinco in 1935.

Romm's first wife Bella died of throat cancer at the age of 47 in August 1925. Romm remarried noted Jewish American physiatrist and phycologist May Romm in 1928. They had a son George Romm.

== Business ==
In 1921 Romm founded the Hudson Builders Corporation with Louis Klosk and Barnet Brodsky and began construction of a five-story apartment building at Grand Concourse and 197th in Bronx, New York.

Living in Westchester County in 1923, with Bella Romm the couple established the Romm Building Corporation of New York City. He was one of the builders of Chester Court on Elm Avenue in Mount Vernon, New York. He served as president of the Pondfield Holding Company of Bronxville. He established and led the Tokonenetie Raalty Company of Mount Vernon and owned the Park Iron Works of New York.

In 1926 he built the 60 unit "Tudor Apartments" through his company Pondfield Holding Company at 26 Pondfield Road, Yonkers.

Romm served as an Honorary Deputy Sheriff or Westchester County.

== Art collection ==
Romm collected work by American Jewish artists including "The Destruction of the Ghetto by Abraham A. Manievich. Romm purchased this painting in the mid 1920s for $15,000.00 at the time one of the largest sums paid for a work by a Jewish artist. Romm loaned the painting to the Brooklyn Museum of Art. The work is today part of the permanent collection of The Jewish Museum in New York.

== Death and legacy ==
On September 25, 1928, at the age of 51, after visiting with a specialist and receiving a diagnosis of advanced incurable stomach cancer, Romm checked into the Hotel Pennsylvania at 401 Seventh Avenue (15 Penn Plaza) in Manhattan at 3:40PM. After a call with May Romm, he explained he gravity of the diagnosis. Having watched his first wife die of cancer he outlined his plan to "end it all". She asked him to wait till she arrived in the city. She drove an hour into New York arriving at 7:00, moments after a maid heard a shot on the thirteenth floor. When hotel management opened the room they found Romm stretched across the bed and a pistol in hand.

It was reported that "She (May Romm) lost the race by seconds, gaining entrance to Romm's room in the hotel while a revolver was still smoking on the floor beside him from a shot that had wounded him fatally in the temple." The incident was front-page news.

In addition to a complex estate, Romm had over a million dollar insurance policy, one of the three largest in the United States in 1928.
