= Pals (1925 film) =

1925 film

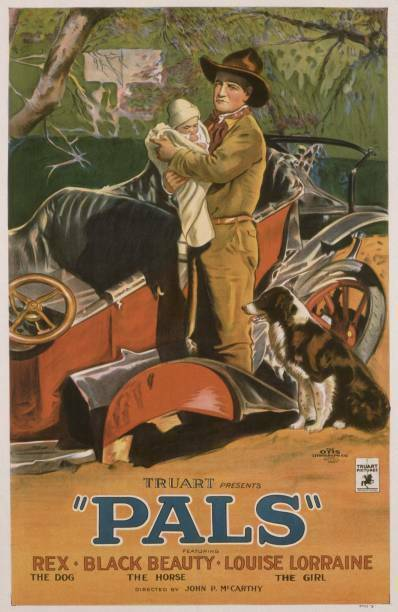
- Theatrical release poster
- Directed by: John P. McCarthy
- Written by: Perry O'Neill (short story); George Hively
- Produced by: Phil Goldstone; M.H. Hoffman
- Starring: Louise Lorraine; Art Acord; Leon De La Mothe
- Cinematography: William C. Thompson
- Production company: Phil Goldstone Productions
- Distributed by: Truart Film Corporation
- Release date: December 11, 1925
- Running time: 50 minutes
- Country: United States
- Language: Silent (English intertitles)

Pals is a 1925 American silent Western comedy film directed by John P. McCarthy and starring Louise Lorraine, Art Acord, and Leon De La Mothe. Lorraine and Acord were married.

== Plot ==
As described in a film magazine review, Bruce Taylor arrives at town with his dog Rex, horse Blackie, and a baby he found in the desert. He takes care of the infant and falls in love with Molly Markham, whose grandfather is under the financial power of Obediah Dillwater, suitor for Molly's hand. Molly helps Bruce out with the baby. Obediah has him arrested on a charge of kidnaping the infant. He escapes from jail with the aid of Rex and Blackie. Later Bruce returns with the sheriff and proof of his innocence, and finds Molly about to marry Obediah. He halts the forced marriage ceremony, whips Obediah, and is now able to wed Molly himself.

== Cast ==
- Louise Lorraine as Molly Markham
- Art Acord as Bruce Taylor
- Leon De La Mothe as Obediah Dillwater
- Andrew Waldron as Molly's Grandpa
- Rex the Dog as Rex, Bruce's Dog
- Black Beauty as Black Beauty, Jim's Horse

== Bibliography ==
- McCaffrey, Donald W. & Jacobs, Christopher P. Guide to the Silent Years of American Cinema. Greenwood Publishing, 1999. ISBN 0-313-30345-2
- Munden, Kenneth White. The American Film Institute Catalog of Motion Pictures Produced in the United States, Part 1. University of California Press, 1997.
