= The Painted Trail (1928 film) =

1928 film directed by J.P. McGowan

- Directed by: J.P. McGowan
- Written by: Tom Roan
- Produced by: Trem Carr
- Starring: Buddy Roosevelt
- Cinematography: Robert E. Cline
- Edited by: Mack V. Wright
- Production company: Trem Carr Pictures
- Distributed by: Rayart Pictures
- Release date: February 1928
- Running time: 50 minutes
- Country: United States
- Languages: Silent; English intertitles

The Painted Trail is a 1928 American silent Western film directed by J.P. McGowan and starring Buddy Roosevelt, Betty Baker and Leon De La Mothe.

== Cast ==
- Buddy Roosevelt as Blaze Marshall
- Betty Baker as Betty Winters
- Leon De La Mothe as Bluff Gunter
- Lafe McKee as Dan Winters
- Tom Bay as Badger James

== Bibliography ==
- Langman, Larry. A Guide to Silent Westerns. Greenwood Publishing Group, 1992.
