= Judith Chafee =

American architect (1932–1998)

Judith Davidson Chafee
- Born: Judith Davidson Bloom; 1932; Chicago, Illinois, United States
- Died: 1998 (aged 65–66)
- Education: Bennington College; Yale University
- Occupation: Architect
- Awards: Fellowship to the American Academy in Rome
- Buildings: Ruth Merrill House Midnight Train to Funking Hill Viewpoint Ramada House Jacobson House Centrum House

Judith Chafee (née Judith Davidson Bloom; 1932–1998) was an American architect known for her work on residential buildings in Arizona. She was a professor of architecture at the University of Arizona. She was a recipient of the National Endowment of the Arts Fellowship to the American Academy in Rome during the middle of her career and was the first woman from Arizona to be named a Fellow of the American Institute of Architects.

== Biography ==
Chafee was born in Chicago in 1932. Her mother, Christina Affeld Davidson, had studied archaeology and anthropology. Judith's biological father died before she was born, but had maintained investments for his family. The family moved to Tucson, Arizona, when Judith was five years old, shortly after her mother remarried Benson Bloom.

Chafee attended a boarding school in Chicago in the late 1940s, earned a visual arts degree at Bennington College in 1954, and enrolled in the School of Architecture at Yale University under the deanship of Paul Rudolph. In 1959, Chafee became the first woman to win the Koppers Architectural Student Design Competition for the design of a 150-bed hospital in Fairfield, Connecticut. However, the award ceremony was held in a men's club and she had to enter through the kitchen to receive the plaque. Chafee graduated from Yale as the only woman in her class and went on to work for Eero Saarinen, Paul Rudolph, Edward Larrabee Barnes, and The Architects Collaborative (Walter Gropius). At the age of 38 Chafee returned to her native Tucson, Arizona to start her own architectural practice.

Chafee worked out of her Tucson office for the remainder of her career, producing mostly single-family residences. Her projects are highly regarded and she became the first woman in Arizona to be named an AIA Fellow. Among other awards, Chafee was awarded the Academy of Rome fellowship to study architecture in Italy. She taught for many years at the University of Arizona, was a visiting professor at the University of Texas and the School of Architecture at Washington University in St. Louis, and led a studio at the Massachusetts Institute of Technology. The Judith Chafee papers are held at the University of Arizona Special Collections library. Within the collection of Chafee's work includes her personal notebooks, photographs she took during her travels, written work, architectural drawings, sketches, and more.

== Major works ==
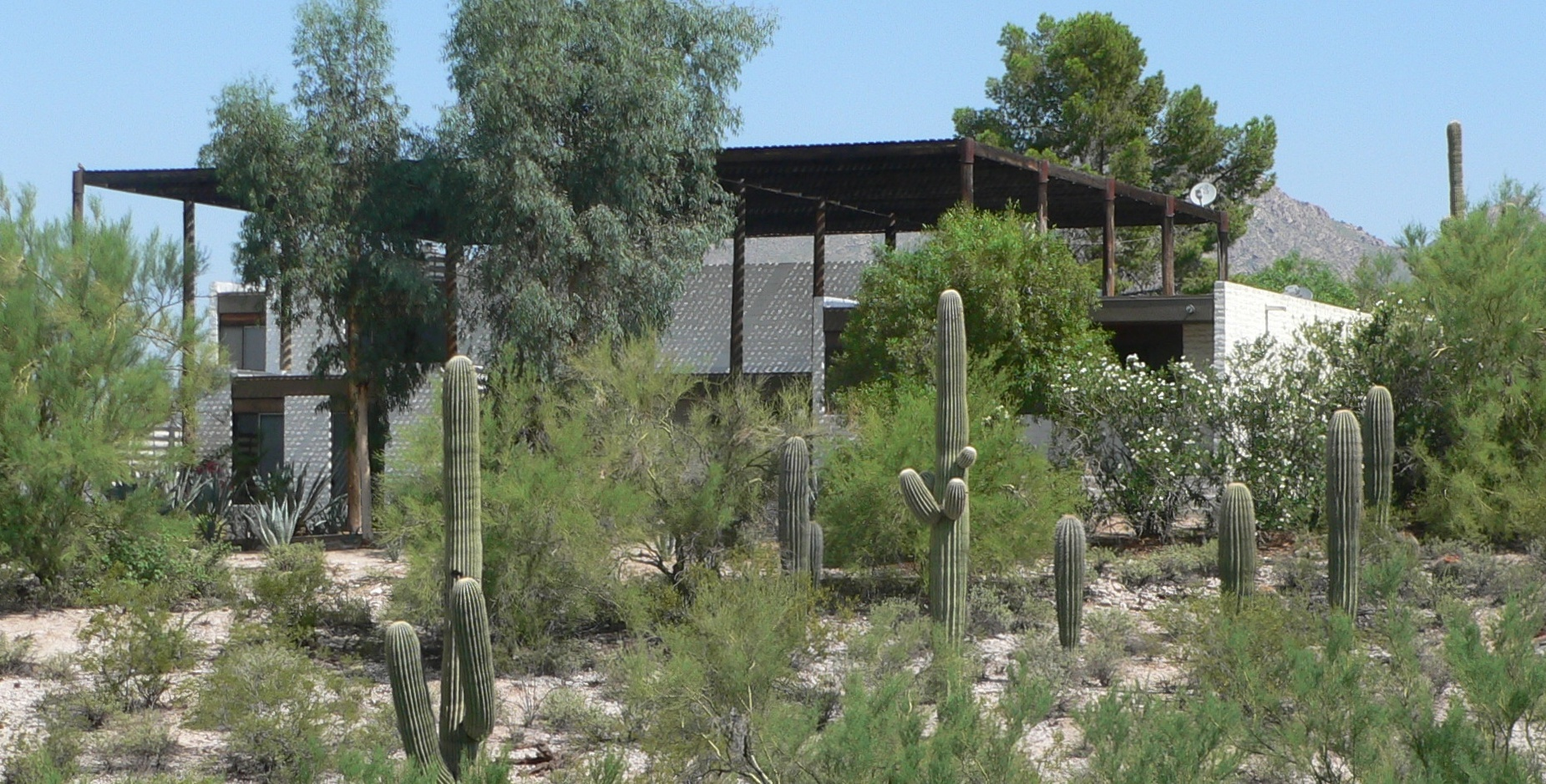
The Ramada House

Chafee's architectural work is predominantly located in Arizona. Significant examples of her work that have been listed on the National Register of Historic Places included Viewpoint (1974), Ramada House (1975) and the Jacobson House (1977) These houses have been widely and internationally published. Ramada House structure has both private rooms and public areas, and features a large shade structure constructed of rounded lengths of wood and two-by-fours. Other prominent designs include:

- Ruth Merrill House, (1969), 51 Andrews Road, Guilford, CT
- Robert Funking House, (1970), 421 Furnace Road, Richmond, MA
- Judith Chafee Studio and Residence, (1971) Adobe Reconstruction, 317 North Court Avenue, Tucson, AZ, NRHP-listed
- Viewpoint, Christina Davidson Bloom Johnson House, (1974), 2840 North Sunrock Lane, Tucson, AZ, NRHP-listed
- Ramada House, Jane Solomon House, (1975), 2801 East Camino Norberto, Tucson, AZ, NRHP-listed
- Jacobson House (1977), 5645 North Campbell Avenue, Tucson, AZ, NRHP-listed
- Jerry Blackwell House (1979), Tucson, AZ, (Demolished by Pima County)
- Hydeman House, (1982), 85 Hog Canyon Road, Patagonia, AZ
- Centrum House, (1984), 6606 Circulo Otono, Tucson AZ.
- Finkel House (1984), 6655 East Placita Alhaja, Tucson, AZ
- Rieveschel House (1988), 7046 North Javelina Drive, Tucson, Arizona

== Published Works ==
Published, written works include:

- “A Study in the Use of Light.” Los Angeles Times: Home Magazine, cover (March 30, 1975)
- “Architectural Record Houses of 1975.” Architectural Record (Mid-May1975)
- “House in Southwest.” House and Garden Building Guide (Spring 1975)
- “Outdoor Showering.” Sunset Magazine (June 1975)
- “Door Pull is Float Handle.” Sunset Magazine (August, 1975)
- “Tree-to-Tree Canal System.” Sunset Magazine (March 1977)
- “Cabinets Step Down the Wall, Add Storage Space.” Sunset Magazine (April 1980)
- Chafee, Judith. “The Region of the Mindful Heart.” Artspace (Spring 1982)
- Watson, Donald. Climatic Design for Home Building. McGraw Hill, 1983
- Nequette, Anne M. and R. Brooks Jeffery. A Guide to Tucson Architecture. Tucson, Arizona: University of Arizona Press, 2000.
