= Max S. Levine =

Jewish-American lawyer, politician and judge

Max Samuel Levine

Judge of the Court of Special Sessions, New York City
- In office 1926–1933

City Magistrate, New York City
- In office 1919–1926

Personal details
- Born: July 6, 1881 Moscow, Russian Empire
- Died: August 27, 1933 (aged 52) New York City, New York
- Party: Democratic
- Spouse: Rae Rosenstein
- Children: 2
- Education: New York University School of Law
- Occupation: Lawyer, Judge, Politician

Max Samuel Levine (July 6, 1881 – August 27, 1933) was a Jewish-American lawyer, politician, and judge from New York City.

== Life ==
Levine was born on July 6, 1881, in Moscow, Russia, the son of Gregory Levine and Rose Weinstein.

Levine immigrated to America and settled in New York City, New York when he was eight. He graduated from the New York University School of Law in 1902. He then entered political life and became affiliated with Tammany Hall, serving as Tammany district leader in the Second Assembly District at one point. He lived on the Lower East Side since he immigrated to America. He initially sold newspapers while attending evening high school. His first official job was as a temporary clerk in the Tenement House Department under future Thomas C. T. Crain. Crain later swore Levine in as General Sessions Judge in 1927, and Levine in turn swore Crain in as District Attorney in 1931. He was a member of the New York City Board of Aldermen from 1906 to 1914. He became consul to the New York State Labor Department in 1915, and in 1918 he became consul to the New York County Clerk.

Levine was an alternate delegate to the 1916 Democratic National Convention. In 1919, Mayor John Francis Hylan appointed him a City Magistrate to succeed William Blau. He later sought the Democratic nomination for Borough President against incumbent Julius Miller. He then withdrew himself as a candidate as part of a deal with Governor Al Smith, who appointed him judge of the Court of Special Sessions. He was elected for a full fourteen-year term as judge in 1927. He also organized the Grand Street Boys' Association in 1916, serving as its first president and again as its president in 1926, and was vice-president of the National Democratic Club in 1926.

Levine was a director of the Institutional Synagogue. In 1907, he married Rae Rosenstein. He had two children, Mrs. Isabel Romm (wife of Emil Romm) and Hazel. He was also a member of the Freemasons, the Elks, and the Loyal Order of Moose.

Levine died on August 27, 1933 at his home. He was in poor health for several months, and while an operation for a stomach ailment three months before his death marked an improvement, his health declined in the six weeks before his death. 2,500 people attended his funeral at Temple Shaare Zedek, including a number of judges, lawyers, city officials, and Tammany leaders, with another 5,000 standing outside. Judge Otto A. Rosalsky, Rabbi Herbert S. Goldstein, and Rabbi Elias Solomon delivered eulogies, with the latter two conducting the service. He was buried in Mount Lebanon Cemetery.
