= Park Place (Tucson, Arizona) =

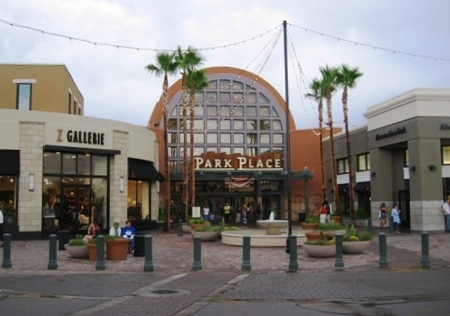
- Park Place main entrance, 2006
- Location: Tucson, Arizona, United States
- Coordinates: 32.2195°N 110.8655°W
- Address: 5870 East Broadway Boulevard
- Opened: May 1975, reopened in 2001
- Developer: Joseph Kivel
- Manager: Pacific Retail Capital Partners
- Owner: Pacific Retail Capital Partners
- Num. of stores: 125
- Num. of anchor tenants: 7 (6 open, 1 vacant)
- Floor area: 1,100,000 square feet (100,000 m^{2}) (GLA)
- Floors: 1 (2 in anchors)
- Website: www.parkplacemall.com

Park Place is a large indoor shopping mall located on the East Side of Tucson, Arizona, United States. The anchor stores are Century Theatres, Dillard's, Round 1 Entertainment, Total Wine & More, Ulta Beauty, and Old Navy. There is 1 vacant anchor store that was once Macy's.

== History ==
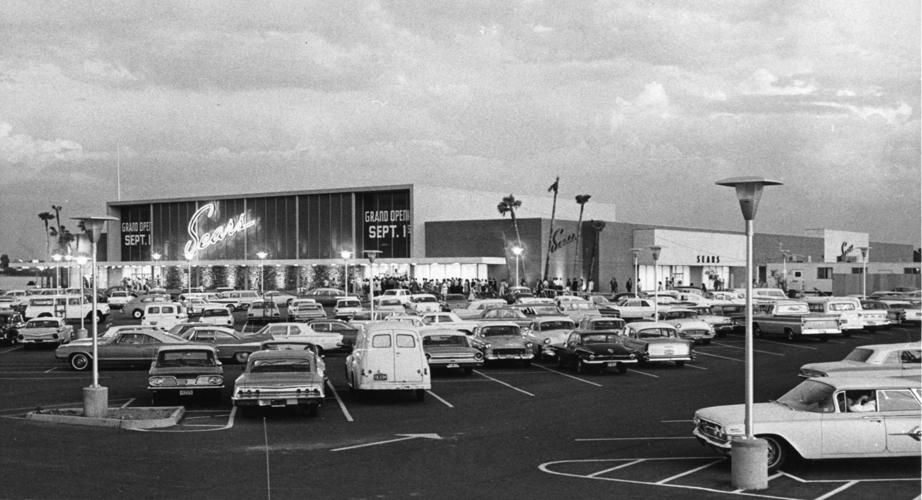
Grand opening of the Sears department store before the build out of Park Mall on E. Broadway Road in Tucson on Sept. 1, 1965. Facing Southeast

Park Place was originally dedicated as Park Mall in May 1975, but was renovated beginning in 1998 and renamed Park Place the following year. The mall is named after Sears Park, which was previously located at the same site and included what was originally a standalone Sears store (which first opened in the fall of 1965), which became the current mall's major anchor (the "Sears Park" linear park site is presently limited to its extreme southern and western portion).

The original stores that opened along with Sears were additional anchors The Broadway (became Macy's in 1996), Furr’s Cafeteria, Mann Theatres, and Diamond's (became Dillard's in 1986), as well as 51 other stores.

In 2015, Sears Holdings spun off 235 of its properties, including the Sears at Park Place, into Sertiage Growth Properties. The Sears store later closed in 2018 as part of the company's ongoing financial woes, and was replaced by a Round1 in October 2019.

On May 28, 2020, it was announced that Macy's would be closing in late 2020. After Macy's closed, Dillard's became the only traditional anchor store left.

In the summer of 2023, the mall was under new ownership and management as the mall was sold at a foreclosure auction to Pacific Retail for $87 million from Brookfield Properties.

As of 2025, major renovation and construction work is continuing in the former Sears building. New stores and services are expected to open in this space in 2026.

In September 2026, it was announced that Pacific Retail would put Park Place up for sale.

== Renovation ==
The 1,100,000-square-foot (100,000 m^{2}), $100 million renovation, completed in 2001, was recognized that year as a Reader's Pick for Best Contemporary Architecture in Tucson Weekly's Best of Tucson awards. The renovation included the addition of an Old Navy, Borders, and Abercrombie & Fitch.

The mall features two anchor stores (Dillard's and Round One Entertainment), a food court, a Southwest-themed children's play area, and a cineplex with 20 screens.
