= May Romm =

American screenwriter, educator, psychiatrist, psychoanalyst

- Born: May Minnie Ethel Ginsburg; October 14, 1892; Vitebsk, Russia
- Died: October 15, 1977 (aged 85); Beverly Hills, California, U.S.
- Occupations: Screenwriter, psychiatrist, psychoanalyst
- Spouse: Alexis Romm (m. 1928)
- Writing career
- Years active: 1925–1977

May E. (Ginsberg) Romm (October 14, 1892 – October 15, 1977) was a Jewish American psychiatrist, Freudian psychoanalyst, educator, and author. After graduating and establishing a practice in New York, Romm moved to Hollywood in 1938 and influenced psychoanalytic infusion in American film. She was an expert on fetishism and exhibitionism and considered the most influential Hollywood Freudian of the mid-twentieth century.

Romm had numerous notable clients including film mogul and producer David O. Selznick. and composer Artie Shaw. She pioneered psychoanalytic themes in films, worked on screenplays from a psychoanalytic approach, and worked with directors including Alfred Hitchcock.

== Early life ==
May Minnie Ethel Ginsburg migrated from Russia with her parents to the United States in 1903. She was described as a compact and ambitious who spent her 1890s childhood in the same shtetl as the painter Marc Chagall. In New York she attended the New York Medical College and Hospital for Women. As a student she showed an exceptional ability recognized in her Second year for her contributions.

After graduating she continued additional training at New York Psychoanalytic and Psychiatric Institutes. Romm practiced at Mount Sinai Hospital (Manhattan) and New York Hospital for several years. She also was a general practitioner in Westchester County.

She was involved with and a donor to the Young Women's Hebrew Association of Mount Vernon. She was married at the end of December 1916 to Lippe L. Colodny and had a daughter Dr. Dorothy Colodny. Her brother Morris Ginsburg was the New York Deputy Commissioner of Safety and the Police Commissioner of Mount Vernon.

She remarried on March 17, 1928, to New York Jewish American businessman and real estate developer Alexis Romm in Mount Vernon, New York and became the step mother of Serge (Sergus) Romm (1903–1933), Emil Romm (1904–1965) and Martha Romm Clinco (1914–1978). She initially maintained her maiden name but after Alexis Romm death in 1928 and subsequent disputes over his estate, she took his last name.

She taught at Columbia University and remained on the staff until her death.

By 1933 Romm was conducting research at Bellevue Hospital, and frequently spoke publicly on topics including child psychology.

== Hollywood career ==
According to The New York Times, "Romm was not the first analyst to make an impact on Hollywood. But she was unquestionably its first real power player; in a career that spanned almost 40 years, her influence sometimes rivaled that of the actors, directors and producers she was treating. In two crucial respects Romm set the pattern for other popular Hollywood shrinks. As the first psychiatric consultant to a major motion picture, she directly influenced what audiences saw on screen. She was also the first analyst to be embraced as a crony by Hollywood's rajahs. She partied with her patients, and in the process became a role model for the star-struck analysts who hoped to follow in her footsteps."

In 1938, Romm moved to Los Angeles and treated producer David O. Selznick and his wife Irene Mayer Selznick, daughter of MGM mogul Louis B. Mayer. Through this relationship Selznick hired Romm as a technical advisor for some of his films. These included Since You Went Away (1944) and the Alfred Hitchcock-directed Spellbound (1945) – Romm served as a Psychiatric Advisor (credited as "May E. Romm M.D.") and uncredited as a contributing writer. She was instrumental as a technical advisor for Miracle on 34th Street (1947).

She was associated with Cedars-Sinai Medical Center serving as senior physiatrist. Romm served as president of the Los Angeles and Southern California Psychoanalytic Societies.

Romm taught at Columbia University College of Physicians and Surgeons and for its Center for Psychoanalytic Training and Research. She also taught at the University of Southern California and lectured around the country.

Between 1948 and 1949 Romm served as treasurer of the American Psychoanalytic Association.

== Later life and legacy ==
Romm died in Los Angeles in October 1977. After her death the USC-May E. Romm Scholarship Fund was established in honor of May E. Romm at the University of Southern California School of Medicine. .

Bruce Graham's 2011 play “Something Intangible” was based on Romm. Romm has been widely recognized for her impact on 1940s – 1960s Hollywood.

== Selected filmography ==
- Since You Went Away (1944)
- Spellbound (1945)
- Miracle on 34th Street (1947)
