= Levy's (department store) =

Business in Tucson, Arizona

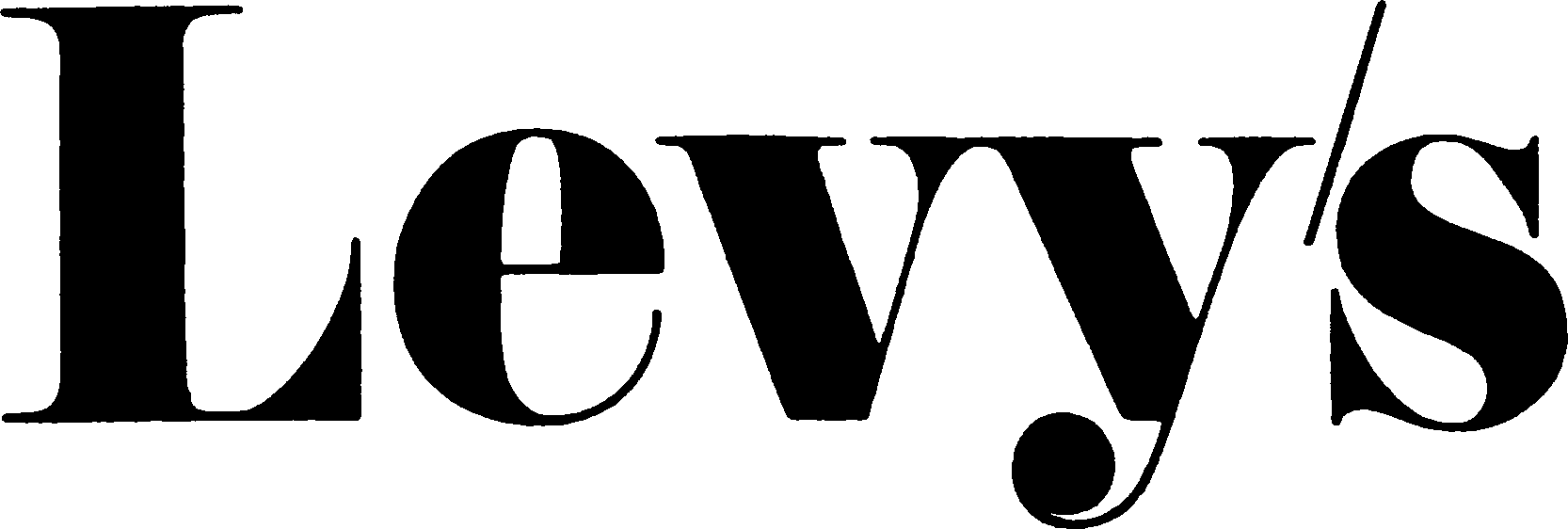
Levy's logo

Levy's, also known as Levy Brothers, was a department store based in Tucson, Arizona, United States. It was founded in 1950 by brothers Jacob and Ben Levy, who acquired the former Myers & Bloom department store in downtown Tucson.

The Levy brothers started department stores in Southern Arizona mining towns such as Douglas, Clifton and later Tucson. They were the main goods stores in the active towns during the early part of the 20th century and carried a full line of clothing. The chain was similar to one in Northern Arizona founded by the Goldwaters.

A second Levy's was later added at El Con Mall, Tucson's oldest shopping mall, in 1960. This store was followed by one in Foothills Mall in 1983.

The store at El Con Mall relocated to a different building in the mall in 1969 (the old building becoming Steinfeld's), which changed names several times. The store was owned by Federated Department Stores, which absorbed it into its other subsidiary (Sanger-Harris) in 1985; Sanger-Harris became Foley's in 1987 and was sold to May Company in 1988. Foley's became Robinsons-May February 2, 1997. It would hold this name until a 2006 conversion to Macy's. This location closed in 2008, and has been demolished for a Walmart Supercenter. The Foothills Mall store similarly became Sanger-Harris, and then Foley's; however, it was closed in 1994 as Foley's, and is now divided between Ross Dress for Less, Nike Factory Store, and a vacant space last occupied by Linens 'N Things.
