= Bernard J. Friedman =

Bernard J. Friedman (Bernie Friedman)
- Born: 1916; Chicago, Illinois, U.S.
- Died: June 21, 2012 (aged 95–96); Tucson, Arizona, U.S.
- Education: University of Illinois
- Occupation: Architect
- Practice: Bernard J. Friedman (1953-1956); Friedman and Jobusch, Architects & Engineers (1956 - 2012)
- Buildings: See list of works
- Spouse: Irma Friedman

Bernard J. Friedman (1916 - June 21, 2012) was an American Jewish architect whose work helped shape Tucson's mid-century modern commercial design.

Friedman's architectural work left a mark on Tucson's mid-century modernism with his bold and expressive designs that encompassed a wide range of commercial, civic, and educational projects. His work not only reflected national and international trends but also adapted to the unique desert climate of southern Arizona.

== See also ==
- Modernism
