= Arthur T. Brown =

American architect (1900–1993)

Arthur Thomas Brown (April 20, 1900 – October 24, 1993) was an American architect who is remembered as “Tucson’s pioneer of solar design.”

== Biography ==
Brown was born in Tarkio, Missouri, and studied at the architecture program of Ohio State University, graduating in 1927. He worked at the Century of Progress exposition in Chicago in 1932 and 1933. Both a fine art painter and trained architect, Brown arrived in Tucson in 1936 and opened his own architectural firm by 1941. He was a member of the exclusive Tucson Palette and Brush Club and the Tucson Fine Arts Association. He is recognized as a "pioneer" in the development of passive solar heating and passive cooling.

His buildings have only recently gained recognition. Many of his works have been lost including: Tucson General Hospital, Tucson Biltmore Motor Hotel and Tucson's Carnegie Free Library (Tucson Children's Museum) wall. His residential projects are scattered throughout Tucson's post World War II mid-century expansion district.

Many of his buildings remain in Tucson including: the First Christian Church at 740 E. Speedway Boulevard, Faith Lutheran Church, 5th street. Delectables Restaurant on N 4th Avenue is also Brown's. It was built in 1945 for the Ingham and Ingham Harley-Davidson dealership. The changes made were primarily interior. He also designed the RON-Tel Hotel ("remain over-night" hotel for pilots) at Tucson International Airport, remodeled in 1976 as airport personnel offices, and a newly demolished (late 2016) airport restaurant, The Tower Grill, which showcased Brown's imaginative "folded plate" roofline.

== Buildings ==
- 1946: Rosenberg House (Tucson)
- 1947: Clifford Goldsmith House (Tucson)
- 1948: Rose Elementary School (Tucson)
- 1949: Faith Lutheran Church (Tucson)
- 1949: Hirsch house (Tucson)
- 1950: Ball-Paylore House (Tucson)
- 1952: Tucson Chamber of Commerce building
- 1953: G.C. Trego house
- 1954: Harold Bell Wright Estates, Dr. William D Carrell House
- 1956: 4535 N. Osage Drive, Edmonson house (Tucson)
- 1959: 2928 N Orlando Avenue (Tucson)
- 1963–70: Tucson General Hospital (later destroyed)
- 1966: 4315 N. La Linda Rama (Tucson)

== Awards and honors ==
- American Institute of Architects College of Fellows (FAIA), 1961

== Patents ==
- Design For A House (US Patent 135609, filed 1943, granted 1943)
- Lightweight Building Construction (US Patent 2440843, filed 1943, granted 1948)
- Method Of Producing A Shell Roof Structure (US Patent 3200026, filed 1960, granted 1965)
- Method Of Producing Shell Roof Structure (US Patent 3263322, filed 1959, granted 1966)
- Conduit System For Structures Having Masonry Walls And Door Frames (US Patent 3303616, filed 1963, granted 1967)
