= Dennis Sharp =

- Born: 30 November 1933; Bedford, England
- Died: 6 May 2010 (aged 76)
- Education: Bedford Modern School
- Alma mater: Architectural Association School of Architecture; University of Liverpool
- Occupation: Architect

Dennis Sharp (30 November 1933 – 6 May 2010) was a British architect, professor, curator, historian, author and editor. His obituary in The Guardian stated that he 'was well-known as an architectural historian, teacher and active defender of the environment. However, his reputation in those fields rather overshadowed his considerable success as a working architect and his long-term commitment to environmentally friendly building'.

== Biography ==
Dennis Sharp was born in Bedford and studied at Bedford Modern School (1945–1951) and at Luton School of Art (1951–1954). From 1954 to 1957, he studied at the Architectural Association School of Architecture in London and was Leverhulme Research Fellow, School of Architecture, University of Liverpool from 1960 to 1963.

In 1962, Sharp became a correspondent for Architectural Design and editor of Architecture North West. In 1963, he was appointed senior research architect, Civic Trust for the North West, Manchester. In the following year he was Lecturer at the School of Architecture, University of Manchester (1964–1968). He was appointed Head of History studies at the AA school in 1968, he was later a senior lecturer. He was AA General Editor and founder Editor of AA Quarterly (1968–1982), and member of the AA school's council and an AA Vice-president.

In 1969, he set up in practice as part of Atelier St. Albans until 1974. In 1988, he became editor of the journal World Architecture: Journal of the International Academy of Architecture of the IAA – International Academy of Architecture in Sofia, Bulgaria. Since 2000, Dennis Sharp was a correspondent for "L'Architettura" Rome/ London, founded by Bruno Zevi.

Sharp was a guest lecturer at Liverpool University (1959–1968), Manchester University (1959–1968), Columbia University New York (1980), the University of Adelaide (1984), University of Malta (1968–1970), Helsinki University of Technology (1998), University of Nottingham (1996–1999) and University College London, RCA, North London Polytechnic, Oxford Brookes University, the University of Cambridge, and the University of Sheffield. Sharp participated in the international architecture symposium "Mensch und Raum" (Man and Space) at the Vienna University of Technology (Technische Universität Wien) in 1984, which received much international attention. Other participants included Justus Dahinden, Pierre Vago, Bruno Zevi, Jorge Glusberg, Otto Kapfinger, Frei Otto, Paolo Soleri, Ernst Gisel, and Ionel Schein.

In 1991, Sharp became a professor at the International Academy of Architecture (IAA) in Sofia, Bulgaria. He was Chairman of the International Committee of Architectural Critics. From 1991 to 1993, he was Vice-President of the Royal Institute of British Architects. In 1992 he was a co-founder of the RIBA Architecture Centre and served as its chairman until 1996.

Dennis Sharp was a partner in Dennis Sharp Architects (DSA) in Hertford and London. Projects include the award-winning Strawdance Studio, the renovation of the major Listed Buildings at Royal Ascot Racecourse (with HOK Sport), house conversions in Cambridge and Hertford and the renovation of Foster's Renault Centre Swindon. He was also Co-Chair of DOCOMOMO in UK.

Sharp was the author and editor of several books, including Modern Architecture and Exrpessionism", London: Longman,1966, "The Picture Place" London: Evelyn "The Bauhaus", Phaidon, "Twentieth Century Architecture. A Visual History" (4th edition:2002) and The Illustrated Encyclopedia of Architects and Architecture (1991) as well as surveys of the work of Calatrava, Manfredi Nicoletti, England and Kurokawa. Recent publications include the new translation of Hermann Muthesius's The English House', Frances Lincoln, 2007.

The Dennis Sharp Archive is held at the Paul Mellon Centre and contains research materials compiled by Sharp during the process of writing the publication Connell, Ward and Lucas: Modern movement architects in England 1929–1939 with Sally Rendel. As well as Sharp's own research notes the archive collection includes original records from the Connell, Ward and Lucas architectural practice including correspondence, photographs, drawings and plans.

He married architect, Yasmin Shariff, in 1983.

== Publications ==
- Dennis Sharp: "Architektur im zwanzigsten Jahrhundert", Praeger, Munich 1973, ISBN 3-7796-4008-2
- Dennis Sharp, Jim Richards, Nikolaus Pevsner: "Anti-Rationalists and the Rationalists", Architectural Press, London, 2000, ISBN 0-7506-4815-5
- Dennis Sharp: "Architecture in Detail – Bauhaus, Dessau, Walter Gropius", Phaidon London, Berlin 2002, ISBN 0-7148-4217-6
- Dennis Sharp, Modern Architecture and Expressionism. Longman London and George Braziller: New York, 1966, ASIN: B000H42EWQ
- Dennis Sharp: "Twentieth Century Architecture: A Visual History", 4th edn, Images Publishing Group, London, 2004, ISBN 1-86470-085-8
- Dennis Sharp: The Illustrated Encyclopedia of Architects and Architecture, Whitney Library of Design, New York, 1991, ISBN 0-8230-2539-X.
- Dennis Sharp, Catherine Cooke, DOCOMOMO: The Modern Movement in Architecture, Uitgeverij, 010 Publishers, 2000, ISBN 90-6450-405-9.
- Dennis Sharp, Sources of Modern Architecture: A Critical Bibliography. Granada, London, 1981, ISBN 0-246-11218-2.3rd edn,
- Dennis Sharp (ed.), Planning and Architecture. Essays presented to Arthur Korn by the Architectural Association, Barrie and Rockliff, London,1967.
- Dennis Sharp (ed.), Santiago Calatrava (Architectural Monographs). Wiley Academy, Chicester, 1996, ISBN 1-85490-454-X.
- Dennis Sharp (ed.),Santiago Calatrava, Spon Press, London, 1994, ISBN 0-419-19570-X.
- Dennis Sharp, Organic Architecture. London, Architectural Press, ISBN 0-7506-1364-5
- Dennis Sharp & Sally Rendel: Connell, Ward and Lucas: Modern movement architects in England 1929–1939, Frances Lincoln, 2008, ISBN 978-0711227682.
