= Patricio Pouchulu =

Argentine architect

- Giza, Egypt / unbuilt
- Born: 13 April 1965 (age 60); Buenos Aires
- Occupation: Architect
- Practice: Pouchulu Architect
- Buildings: MNBA/Moderno, Royal Flats, Casa Atelier
- Projects: Bamiyan, Grand Egyptian Museum, London Bridge Project, Ciudad en el Desierto.

Patricio Pouchulu (born April 13, 1965) is a contemporary organic architect.

Born in Buenos Aires, he graduated as an architect at Universidad de Buenos Aires before moving to London to study with Peter Cook at The Bartlett School of Architecture, University College London, where he got a M.Arch. He was awarded by the British Council and Fondo Nacional de las Artes. He taught at the University of Buenos Aires (1989–1996), Fachhochschule-Munich, Germany (1999–2004). He is invited as external critic at the Bartlett and other schools since 2000. He is investigating on Habitat.

== Architecture and influence ==
Pouchulu is a faraway disciple of Frank Lloyd Wright. His architecture has various exploratory lines, in the lineage of Hugo Häring, John Lautner and Paul Rudolph. His approach to Futurism, Expressionism, Japanese architecture and African art gives his projects atemporal, refreshing atmospheres, already present in his early architectural drawings and paintings. His work is devoted to the exploration of unknown architectural territories and contemporary Utopias.

In Buenos Aires he experienced the Modern Movement through the early work of Clorindo Testa; after visiting his office in the late eighties they eventually became friends. He co-organized events with Jorge Glusberg (CAYC) for the BA/Bienal Internacional de Arquitectura de Buenos Aires, where he exhibited experimental projects. Hosted by Peter Cook, in 2000 Pouchulu lectured in London on his Architectural Fictions. He attended the Venice Biennale, and Documenta in Kassel, where he met Yona Friedman.

== Understanding ==
Pouchulu's predicate shows a subtle oscillation between historical principles and contemporary programmes, in pursuit of synthesis and symbolic unity. He is detached from conceptual fragmentation, parametric resources or digital imaginary as a source of inspiration. Furthermore, he has been an outsider of architectural movements like Deconstructivism. Though his spaces are often composed with methods from Structuralism, they show a high degree of freedom, probably inspired by Oscar Niemeyer. His work exudes spirituality, like his Grand Egyptian Museum or House in a Cliff.

== Practice ==
Pouchulu is partnering with engineers Patrick Teuffel (Stuttgart), developing a sustainable project in the Netherlands, and since 2005 with Nick MacLean (working on conversions in protected areas in central London). Previously he worked with Susanne Biek on international competitions (Munich 1999–04). He has been applying working parameters produced from his researches, particularly ESP (Essential Spatial Project) and LEA (Light Easy Architecture), where structural and function configurations are co-determined by lightweight components and green energy.

== Habitat ==
He is researching on Earth's Sciences, particularly Climate Change and Habitat, warning about the imminent catastrophe produced by Overpopulation, Overexploitation and Global Warming. His recent projects analyze modular design methods and passive cooling.

== Projects ==
Below is a selection of projects:

- MNBA/Moderno, Museo Nacional de Bellas Artes (Buenos Aires) (proposed extension), Argentina, 2000–16
- Cyclotel, The Netherlands and Europe, 2012–20
- Stockholm Library, Stockholm, Sweden, 2007
- Olive House, near the Walhalla temple, Bavaria, Deutschland, 2006
- Valhall House, Hardanger, Hardangerfjord, Norway, 2003
- Kalevala, Åland, Finland, 2002
- Grand Egyptian Museum, Giza, Egypt, 2002
- Bauer House, Scotland, United Kingdom, 2001
- Meran thermal baths, Meran, Italy, 1999
- London Bridge Project, London, United Kingdom, 1998
- Project for a city in the desert, Patagonia, Argentina, 1996
- House in a Cliff, California, 1994
- Gaboto Building, 1st. version, Buenos Aires, Argentina, 1986

== Articles ==
- http://chroniquesdebuenosaires.hautetfort.com/tag/patricio%20pouchulu
- http://www.politics.co.uk/comment-analysis/2012/02/13/comment-despite-falklands-argentina-and-britain-can-still-be
- https://getinfo.de/app/Dreams-and-Visions-Patricio-Pouchulu/id/BLSE%3ARN151253347%5B%5D
- http://www.arqchile.cl/pouchulu_arquitecto.htm
- http://archive-cl.com/page/1346807/2013-02-07/http://www.arqchile.cl/critica.htm%5B%5D
- https://web.archive.org/web/20071024045453/http://www.elcorreogallego.es/canalInmobiliario/index.php?idMenu=3
