= Alberto Camenzind =

Swiss architect

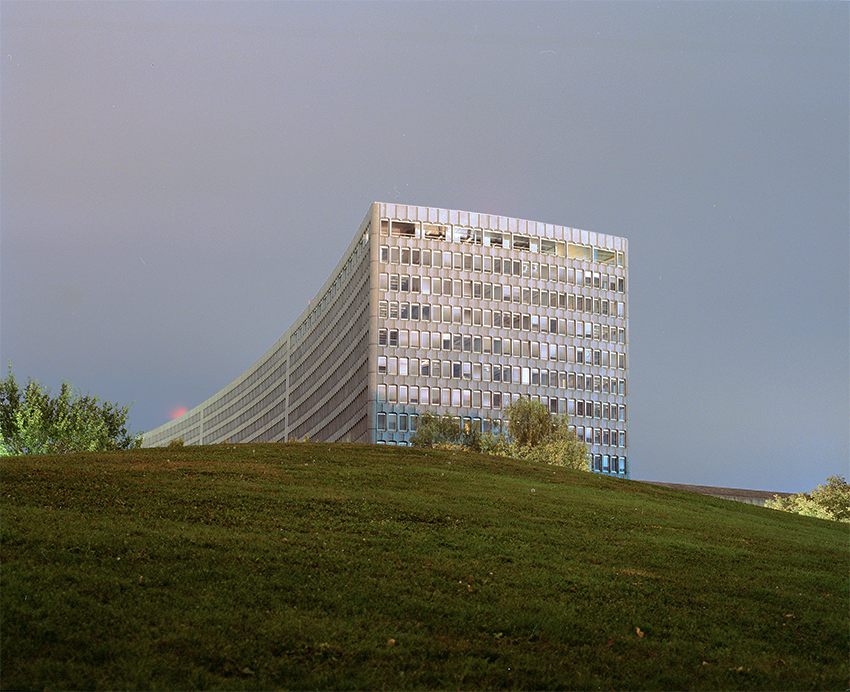
- "Bureau International du Travail" (south side)
- Born: 7 June 1914; Lugano, Ticino, Switzerland
- Died: 29 September 2004 (aged 90); Astano, Ticino, Switzerland
- Occupation(s): Architect, university teacher
- Spouse: Gabriella Bargna

Alberto Camenzind (7 June 1914, in Lugano – 29 September 2004, in Astano) was a Swiss architect from Ticino. He also became a professor at the prestigious Eidgenössische Technische Hochschule Zürich ("Zürich Technical University").

== Early years ==
Alberto Camenzind was the son of, Eduard Camenzind, a hotelier originally from Gersau in the (officially German speaking) Canton of Schwyz, by his marriage to Chiara d'Ambrogio. He attended secondary school in Lugano. Between 1933 and 1939 he studied architecture with, among others, Professor William Dunkel at the Zürich Technical University, where fellow architecture students included Max Frisch (subsequently better remembered as a writer than as an architect) and Justus Dahinden.

== Professional career ==
On completing his studies he worked at the studios of the architects Otto Rudolf Salvisberg and William Dunkel. Returning south, in 1942 he opened his own architectural studio in Lugano, working in association with Bruno Brocchi between 1959 and 1991. His early work as an independent architect included houses in Cademario (1953) and Sorengo (1957). Camenzind's first public commission was a secondary school (today a "Media School") in Bellinzona (1958), followed by the main building for the RTSI (the Swiss Italian language TV/Radio station), completed between 1958 and 1961, undertaken by Camenzind in collaboration with Augusto Jäggli and Rino Tami. He was also responsible for the headquarters, at Agno, of the Swiss Alfa Romeo importer (1963) which has subsequently been converted into a Migros supermarket) and the Gmür House (1963 "la Casa Gmür") in Brissago.

Outside Switzerland Camenzind became much better known in 1964 when he was appointed a co-director for the "EXPO 64" exhibition in Lausanne. As chief architect he was responsible for designing "multi-cell format" exhibition halls for the event. Particular attention was paid to the repeating "Swiss Way" ("Weg der Schweiz") Leitmotif that was a feature of this "Expo".

In 1965 he was appointed to a professorship at the Zürich Technical University, where he became a professor emeritus in 1981.

Collaborating with the structural engineers Pier Luigi Nervi and the French architect Eugène Beaudouin, Camenzind was the lead architect for the "Bureau International du Travail", built at Geneva for the ILO between 1969 and 1975. At the time this immense structure was Switzerland's largest office building, with a length of 200 meters and a height of 50 meters.

Closer to home, one of his last major projects was the Quartiere Maghetti (1984) in the Ticinese capital, characterized by exposed concrete and dry stone wall facings.

== Honours and committees ==
Alberto Camenzind was granted honorary citizenship of Lugano in 1964. He was a member of the Swiss and Ticinese Memorial Preservation Commissions ("Denkmalpflegekommission[en]"), between 1964 and 1968 he was President of the Swiss Central Architects' Federation and, between 1965 and 1972, a member of the Federal Fine Arts Commission ("Eidgenössischen Kunstkommission").

== Retirement and death ==
He retired to Astano in 1997, and it was here that he died in 2004.
