= Bruno Zevi =

Italian architect, historian, professor, curator, author, and editor

- Born: 22 January 1918; Rome, Italy
- Died: 9 January 2000 (aged 81); Rome, Italy
- Education: University of Rome, Harvard Graduate School of Design
- Occupations: Architecture critic, architect, historian, author
- Spouse: Tullia Calabi (m. 1940)

Bruno Zevi (22 January 1918 – 9 January 2000) was an Italian architect, historian, professor, curator, author, and editor. Zevi was a vocal critic of "classicising" modern architecture and postmodernism.

== Early life ==
Zevi was born and died in Rome. His family was Italian Jewish. (Note: His kin never kept him from openly expressing his own ideas: Art Kutcher ("Politics could do more harm than the planners in Jerusalem". The Times. No. 59483. 25 August 1975. p. 6.) remembers a protest in 1970 against Teddy Kollek, opposing the project of building an underground parking near the Jaffa Gate.)

On finishing school in 1933, he enrolled at the Faculty of Architecture at the University of Rome. Due to the anti-Semitic laws, Zevi was forced in 1938 to abandon his studies, and so left for London, UK, before moving to the United States. Zevi graduated from the Harvard Graduate School of Design, then under the directorship of Walter Gropius.

In 1940 he married Italian journalist and writer Tullia Calabi. While in the US, he discovered the work of Frank Lloyd Wright, which became one of the bases for his championing of organic architecture. Zevi returned to London in 1943, working as a translator in the war effort.

== Association for Organic Architecture ==
In 1944, he founded the influential Association for Organic Architecture (APAO). The following year the magazine Metron-architecture reviewed his book Towards an Organic Architecture, which brought him international acclaim.

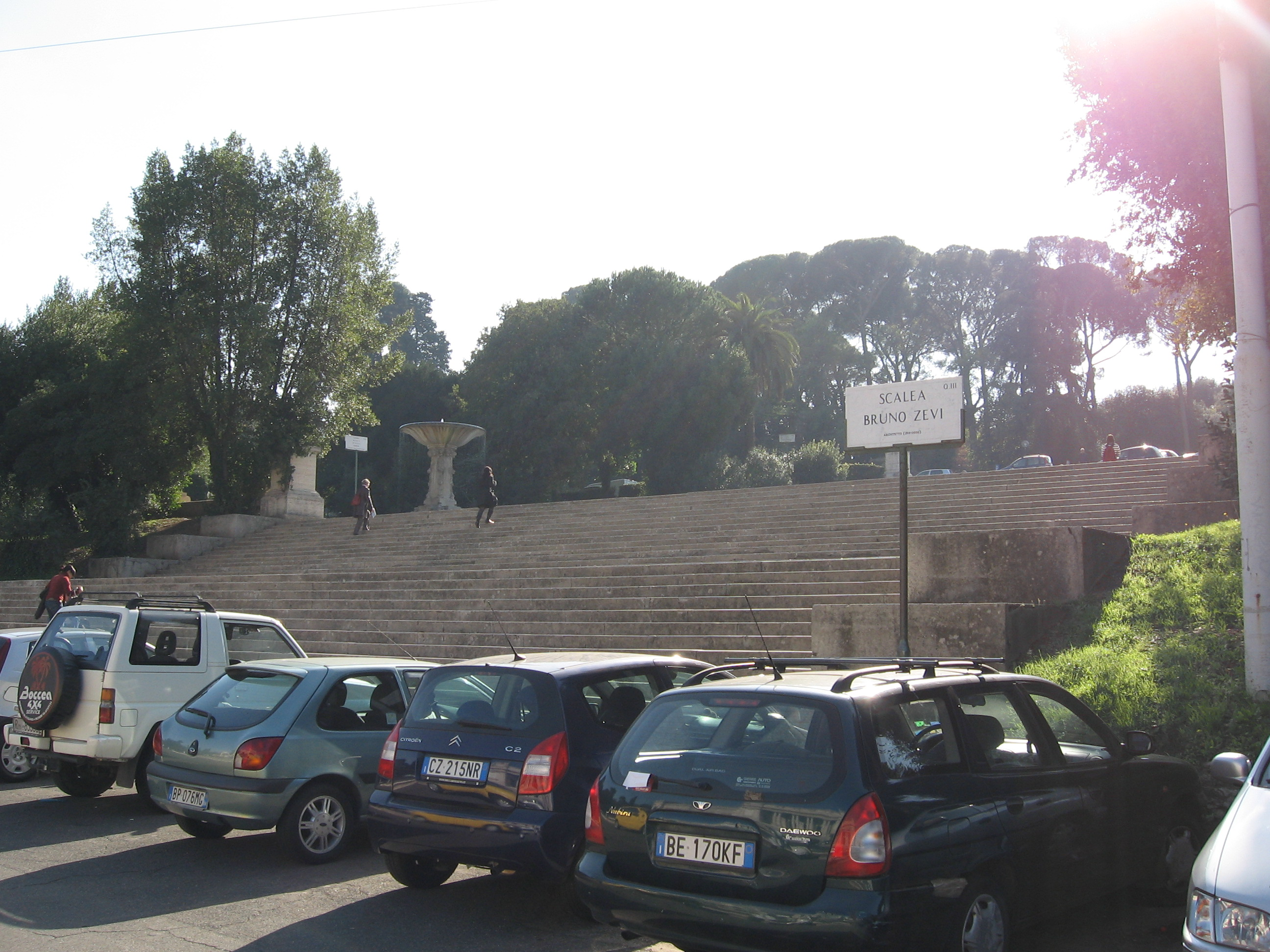
A stairway in Rome named in his honor

== University professor ==
In 1945, Zevi became Professor of Architectural History at the University of Venice. Later, he was a professor at the University of Rome, and a member of the International Academy of Architecture (IAA) in Sofia, Bulgaria.

== Editor, writer and politician ==
From 1955 onwards, he wrote a column for the weekly L'Espresso magazine. He was an active member of the Italian Jewish community and took part in anti-fascist activities within the Giustizia e Libertà movement. He was active in the Action Party and later in Popular Unity and in the Radical Party, which he represented in the Chamber of Deputies from 1987 to 1992. From 1954 until his death in 2000, he was editor of his own magazine L'architettura. Cronache e storia.

The Modern Language of Architecture is one of Zevi's most significant publications. In this book, Zevi sets forth seven principles or “antirules” to codify the language of architecture created by Le Corbusier, Gropius, Mies van der Rohe, and Wright. In place of the classical language of the Beaux Art school, with its focus on abstract principles of order, proportion, and symmetry, he presents an alternative system of communication characterized by a free interpretation of contents and function, an emphasis on difference and dissonance, a dynamic of multidimensional vision, and independent interplay of elements, an organic marriage of engineering and design, a concept of living spaces that are designed for use, and an integration of buildings into their surroundings. Anticipating the innovations of postmodern architecture, Zevi argues forcefully for complexity and against unity, for decomposition and dialogue between architecture and historiography, finding elements of the modern language of architecture throughout history, and discussing the process of architectural innovation.

== Architecture as space ==
Zevi argued in Saper vedere l'architettura that space is essential for both the definition and appreciation of architecture. He also maintained that space is empty until it is occupied by visual messages. Zevi held that this space is animated by the gestures and actions of those who inhabit it. He is also known as an advocate of the spatial ideas of Frank Lloyd Wright.

== Modern architecture movement ==
Zevi participated in the influential International Architecture Symposium "Mensch und Raum" (Man and Space) at the Vienna University of Technology (Technische Universität Wien) in 1984, also attended by Justus Dahinden, Ernst Gisel, Jorge Glusberg, Otto Kapfinger, Frei Otto, Ionel Schein, Dennis Sharp, Paolo Soleri, and Pierre Vago.

Such was Zevi's uncompromising critique of any tendency in modern architecture towards classicism that he even would criticise those architects he otherwise admired: "When Gropius, Mies and Aalto produced [symmetrical buildings] it was an act of surrender. Lacking a modern code, they weakened and regressed to the familiar womb of classicism." Zevi claimed that modernism is superior to classicism for its tendency to equate symmetry with fear of living, schizophrenia, and passivity. He also criticized the use of artificial light, stating that it is offensive and antithetical to architectural values.

== Quotes ==
"In 1973, Zevi set out (his) ideas as a set of invariants – a sort of anti-classical codebook that attempted to define modernity as a language of asymmetry and dissonance, which he propagated via his magazine L'architettura, cronache e storia. This exciting theory of architecture as rupture and fragmentation marks him out as the seminal theoretician for all currents of modernism interested in iconoclasm and deconstruction, from Alvar Aalto in the 1930s to Daniel Libeskind in the 1990s."

== Select publications ==
- Zevi, Bruno (1945). Verso un'architettura organica (in Italian). Torino: Giulio Einaudi editore.
  - (English translation) Zevi, Bruno (1950). Towards an Organic Architecture. London: Faber & Faber.
- Zevi, Bruno (1948). Saper vedere l'architettura (in Italian). Torino: Einaudi.
  - (English translation) Zevi, Bruno (1957). Architecture as Space. How to Look at Architecture. Translated by Milton Gendel. New York: Horizon Press.
- Zevi, Bruno (1950). Storia dell'architettura moderna (in Italian). Torino: Einaudi.
- Zevi, Bruno, ed. (1964). Michelangiolo architetto. Milan: Etas Kompass.
- Zevi, Bruno, ed. (1970). Erich Mendelsohn Opera Completa. Milan: Etas Kompass.
  - (English translation) Zevi, Bruno, ed. (1999). Erich Mendelsohn: The Complete Works. Berlin: Birkhäuser Verlag. ISBN 3764359757.
- Zevi, Bruno (1973). Spazi dell'architettura moderna (in Italian). Torino: Einaudi.
- Zevi, Bruno (1978a). Cronache di architettura (in Italian) (2 ed.). Rome–Bari: Laterza.
- Zevi, Bruno (1978b). The Modern Language of Architecture. Seattle: University of Washington Press. ISBN 0295955686.
- Zevi, Bruno (1979). Editoriali di architettura (in Italian). Torino: Einaudi.
