= Jorge Glusberg =

Argentine academic and author

- Born: Jorge Benjamín Glusberg; 23 September 1932; Buenos Aires, Argentina
- Died: 2 February 2012 (aged 79); Buenos Aires, Argentina
- Occupations: Author; Publisher; Curator; Professor; Conceptual artist
- Years active: 1968-2012

Jorge Glusberg (23 September 1932 – 2 February 2012) was an Argentine author, publisher, curator, professor, and conceptual artist.

== Early life and education ==
Glusberg was born in Buenos Aires, Argentina.

When he was 12 years old Glusberg organized a "geology museum" on balcony of his house. In the space he exhibited rocks and other found objects from the Pampas for fellow neighborhood kids.

== Career ==
In 1968, Glusberg, along with Víctor Grippo, Jacques Bedel, Luis Fernando Benedit and others, founded the Centro de Estudios de Arte y Comunicación (CEAC) which was renamed Centro de Arte y Comunicación (CAyC) in the following year. Glusberg acted as Director of Centro de Arte y Comunicación (CAyC) from its inception until his death in early 2012.

In 1985 Glusberg founded the Buenos Aires International Biennial of Architecture. In 1994 Glusberg was appointed Director of the Museo Nacional de Bellas Artes MNBA in Buenos Aires, a title which he held until 2003. Glusberg is recognized for creating the Photography Department at MNBA in 1995 though the appointment of Sara Facio as Curator of Photography.

Glusberg was co-director of Comité Internacional de Críticos de Arquitectura CICA. In 2002 he was leader of the Buenos Aires Biennale.

Glusberg participated in the international architecture symposium "Mensch und Raum" (Man and Space) at the Vienna University of Technology (Technische Universität Wien) in 1984, which received much international attention. Other participants included Justus Dahinden, Pierre Vago, Bruno Zevi, Dennis Sharp, Frei Otto, Paolo Soleri and Ionel Schein. He wrote and edited several books about architecture, design and art in Latin America. He was a professor at New York University, Ball State University, National University of San Antonio Abad in Cuzco and University of Veracruz.

From 1978 to 1986, and from 1989 to 1992, Glusberg was president of the International Committee of Architectural Critics, Argentine chapter.

== Honours and awards ==
- 1981: Biennale (Sofia, Bulgaria), Gold Medal
- International Union of Architects UIA, Jean Tschumi-Prize for Criticis
- 1981: Knight Commander of Peru
- 1987: Chevalier of the Ordre des Palmes Académiques

== Selected exhibitions ==
- 1969: Arte y cibernética, Galería Bonino de (Buenos Aires, Argentina)
- 1972: Arte e ideología en CAyC al aire libre (Buenos Aires, Argentina)
- 1974: Art Systems in Latin America, ICA (Londres, Reino Unido)
- 1977: Identification of Artist - a book, Escola de Artes Visuais do Parque Lage (EAV/Parque Lage, Rio de Janeiro, Brazil)
- 1977: Bienal Internacional de São Paulo, Fundação Bienal (São Paulo, Brazil)
- 1979: Bienal Internacional de São Paulo, Fundação Bienal (São Paulo, Brazil)
- 1999: Bienal de Artes Visuais do Mercosul (Porto Alegre, Brazil)
- 1985: Bienal Internacional de São Paulo, Fundação Bienal (São Paulo, Brazil)
- 2001: Bienal de Artes Visuais do Mercosul, Museu de Arte do Rio Grande do Sul Ado Malagoli (Porto Alegre, Brazil)

== Selected works and publications ==
- Glusberg, Jorge (1972). Benedit: Phitotron (PDF). New York: Museum of Modern Art: Centro de Arte y Comunicación. OCLC 1022847808.
- Lamelas, David; Glusberg, Jorge (October 1978). David Lamelas: Fifteen Years (Exhibition catalog). Buenos Aires: Centro de Arte y Comunicación. OCLC 19229457.
- Glusberg, Jorge; Botta, Mario (1980). The Architecture of Mario Botta, between History and Memory: The Past As a Friend (Exhibition catalog). Buenos Aires: Centro de Arte y Comunicación. OCLC 313721847.
- Glusberg, Jorge (texto) (May 1982). Grupo IIIII: Ernesto Bertani, Pablo Bobbio, Guillermo Kuitca, Miguel Melcon, Osvaldo Monzo (Exhibition catalog) (in Spanish). Buenos Aires: Centro de Arte y Comunicación. OCLC 945939664. – Galena del Retiro (Madrid)
- Oliva, Achille Bonito; Ratcliff, Carter; Simmen, Jeannot L.; Cherubini, Laura; Beaton, Alexandra; Skreiner, Wilfried; De Loisy, Jean; Boué, Marie; Curiger, Bice; Sizoo, Hans; Bex, Flor; Mats, B.; Medved, Andrej; Wallace, Ian; Murphy, Bernice; Barzel, Amnon; Glusberg, Jorge; Moure, Gloria (1982). Trans avant garde International = The International Trans-avantgarde = La transavanguardia internazionale (Exhibition catalog) (in English, Italian, German, and French). Milan, Italy: Giancarlo Politi Editore. OCLC 923259856.
- Grachos, Louis (curator); Grachos, Louis (text by); Glusberg, Jorge (text by); Bercht, Fatima (preface by) (1989). New Image Painting, Argentina in the Eighties: Rafael Bueno, Guillermo Kuitca, Alfredo Prior (Exhibition catalog). New York: Americas Society/Art Gallery. OCLC 47706329. – Checklist of an exhibition held at the Americas Society Art Gallery February 23-April 16, 1989
