= CICA =

CICA may refer to:

- Canadian Institute of Chartered Accountants
- Comité Internacional de Críticos de Arquitectura (International Committee of Architectural Critics)
- Commission to Inquire into Child Abuse or Ryan Commission, Ireland, 1999-2009
- Conference on Interaction and Confidence-Building Measures in Asia
- Context Inspired Component Architecture, a data architecture Standard; see ASC X12
- Competition in Contracting Act, US law on federal procurement
- Criminal Injuries Compensation Authority, UK
- CICA-DT, TV station of TVOntario, Canada
