= Pierre Vago =

French architect

Pierre Vago (30 August 1910, in Budapest – 27 January 2002, in Noisy-sur-École) was a French architect. Vago was known internationally as the publisher of L'Architecture d'Aujourd'hui and General Secretary of the International Union of Architects, of which he remained the honorary president until his death.

== Life ==
Pierre Vago, born in Budapest, studied at the École Spéciale d'Architecture (ESA) in Paris. Because of his housing projects, factories, and the Central Banks of the French colonies of Tunisia and Algeria, as well as his controversial Basilica of St. Pius X in Lourdes, he received much attention in the postwar years. In 1957, he designed one of the new residential buildings in the Berlin's Hansaviertel. In 1974, he built the Campus Pont-de-Bois for the University of Lille located in Villeneuve d'Ascq in eastern Lille.

As the publisher of the influential magazine, L'Architecture d'Aujourd'hui (Today's Architecture) Pierre Vago became an internationally renowned architecture critic. In 1948, he founded the International Union of Architects, and also served as its General Secretary for many years. His goal was to unite all the architects of the world in an umbrella organization of all the national architects' associations. In 2005, the UIA is recognized in 95 countries and thus represents ca. 1.5 million architects. Under the direction of the UIA, East and West German architects were brought together at the end of the 1950s. Vago was a proponent of Franco-German reconciliation politics.

The 1984 International Architecture Symposium "Mensch und Raum" (Man and Space) at the Vienna University of Technology (Technische Universität Wien) received international attention. Among the participants were Pierre Vago as well as, amongst others, Justus Dahinden, Dennis Sharp, Bruno Zevi, Jorge Glusberg, Otto Kapfinger, Frei Otto, Paolo Soleri, Ernst Gisel, Ionel Schein.

Pierre Vago was also an honorary member of the Royal Institute of British Architects, the German Bund Deutscher Architekten, and the American Institute of Architects.

== Publications (selection) ==
- Pierre Vago: l'Architecture d'aujourd'hui, revue internationale d'architecture contemporaine, Paris, 1971, ISBN B0000DWOHP
- Gabriel Epstein, Pierre Vago, Klaus Müller-Rehm: Architektur-Experimente in Berlin und anderswo. Für Julius Posener, 1989, ISBN 3-924812-24-1
- Pierre Vago: L'UIA, 1948-1998, Epure 1998, ISBN 2-907687-58-1
- Pierre Vago: Pierre Vago, une vie intense, Aam 2000, ISBN 2-87143-110-8
- Maria Grazia Turco, Pierre Vago, un architetto cittadino del mondo, in Saggi in onore di Gaetano Miarelli Mariani, “Quaderni dell’Istituto di Storia dell’Architettura”, Dipartimento di Storia dell’Architettura, Restauro e Conservazione dei Beni Architettonici, a cura di M. P. Sette, M. Caperna, M. Docci, M. G. Turco, N. S., 44–50, (2004-2007), pp. 319–330, ISSN 0485-4152.
- Maria Grazia Turco, Pierre Vago architetto e urbanista, in Pierre Vago e la cultura architettonica del Novecento, a cura di Maria Grazia Turco, Edizioni Quasar, Roma 2020, pp. 41–62, ISBN 978-88-5491-051-5.
