= Françoise Mézières =

French physiotherapist (1909 – 1991)

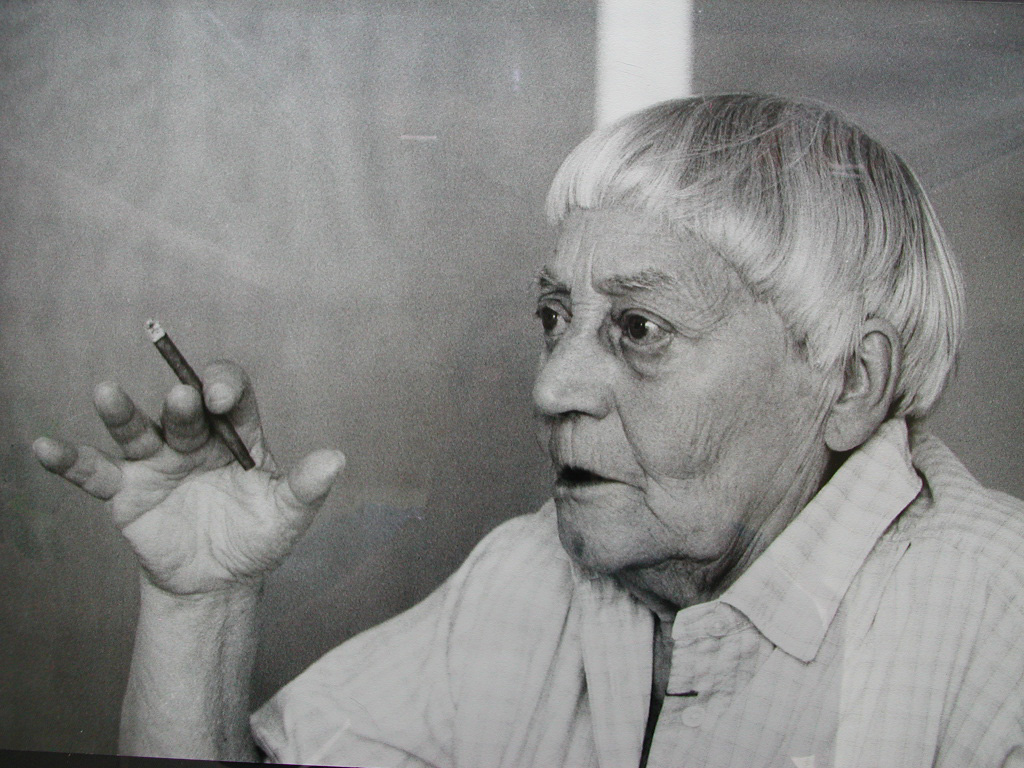
Françoise Mézières

Françoise Mézières (18 June 1909 – 17 October 1991) was an internationally renowned French physiotherapist. She was also known for extensively practicing applied kinesiology. In 1947 she developed a physiotherapy technique, known as Mézières Method.

== Biography ==
Françoise Mézières was born on 18 June 1909 in Hanoi. She studied at the French School of Orthopedics and Massage, Paris. Mézières was “teaching and practising classical segmented physiotherapy.”

Meanwhile, she found that the body's movement needs to be adjusted in accordance with its tonic system. She emphasized the importance of “global stretch of muscle chains” through which all connecting parts of the body must be “stretched and readjusted at the same time.”

Her physiotherapy techniques are in the nature of “postural reconstruction work”. In 1947 she developed Mézières Method, an orthopedic form of bodywork, which tried to rebalance the different muscle and joint chains through guided stretching exercises.

In 1976, Mezieres's theory and kinesiology practices gained worldwide recognition following the publication of the best-seller Le Corps a ses raisons by Therese Bertherat and Carole Bernstein.

She died in Noisy-sur-École on 17 October 1991.
