= 2026 Fontainebleau wildfire =

Wildfires in France

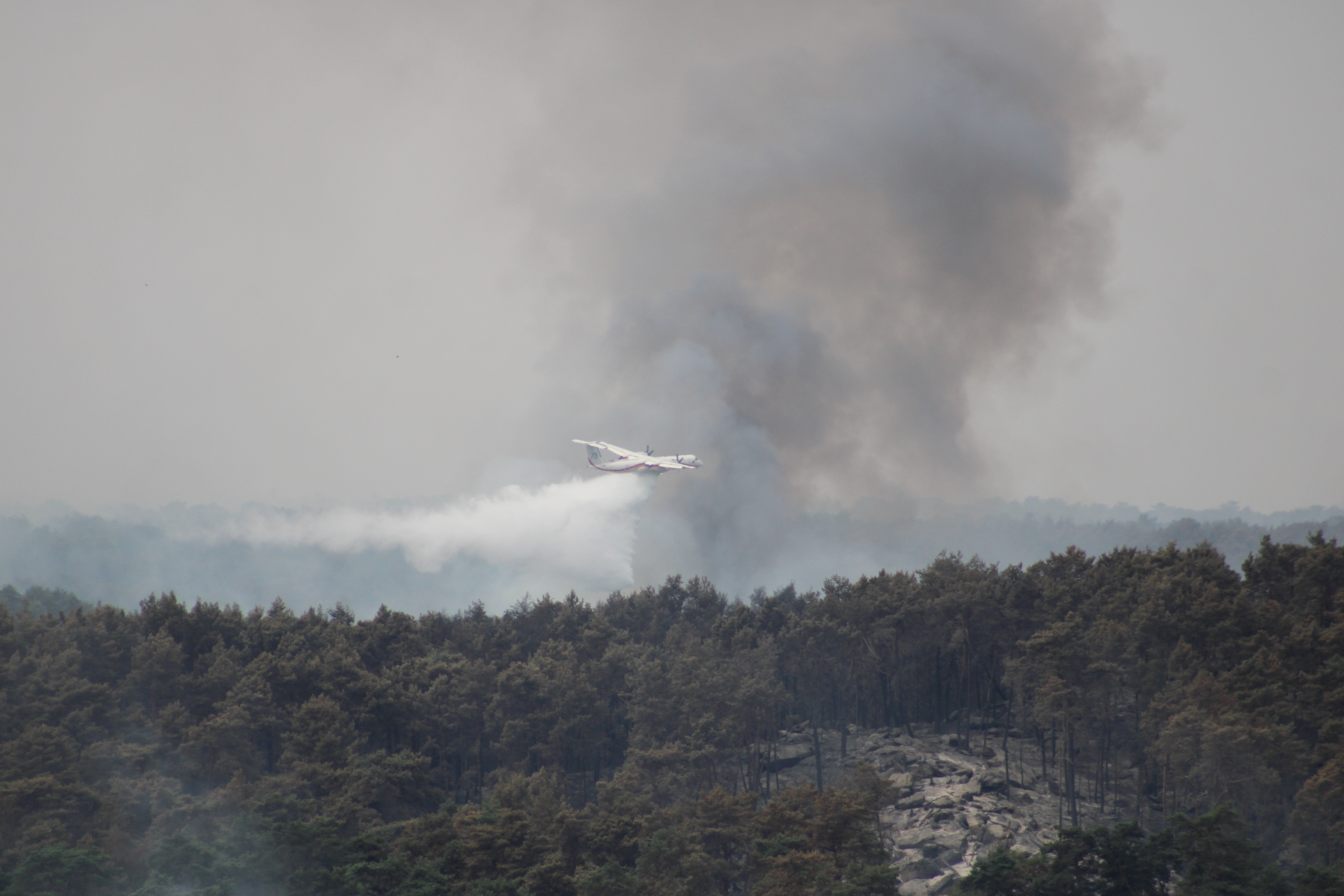
- Bombardier Q400 (Dash 8) aircraft responding to the Faisanderie fire. Photographed from the Warnery Tower on 15 July 2026.

The 2026 wildfires in the Fontainebleau forest were major wildfires that broke out in the Forest of Fontainebleau, beginning on 12 July 2026 and being contained on 14 July. They were the most significant fires of the season in the area, affecting the Fontainebleau and Trois-Pignons forests and several municipalities. The fires occurred in two main areas, with the second appearing on 13 July near the town of Fontainebleau.

== Background ==
=== Climate change ===
Although wildfires can have human causes (accidental or deliberate) or natural causes, climate change increases the risk of wildfires in France, particularly through the increasing frequency and intensity of heat waves and droughts, which constitute two of the three parameters of the 30-30-30 rule. The wildfire risk is expanding towards northern France as a result of warming and is likely to affect the Île-de-France region increasingly often.

=== Vulnerabilities of the forest in 2026 ===
The Forest of Fontainebleau has experienced a sharp increase in visitor numbers. The forest receives between 15 and 18 million visitors per year, an estimated 25% increase over a decade. Visitor numbers are concentrated in certain easily accessible or particularly well-known areas, notably the Trois-Pignons massif, climbing sites and the Vingt-Cinq-Bosses circuit. This is accompanied by regular parking congestion and an increase in outdoor activities, including climbing, hiking, running and mountain biking. Vulnerabilities linked to heat, drought and parasites are added to this human pressure. Repeated trampling accelerates soil erosion, encourages the appearance of unofficial trails and can expose tree roots. In some heavily visited areas, ground level has fallen by more than one metre in less than ten years. The concentration of visitors also increases the need for surveillance, public awareness and development of the forest. Night-time visitation is a particular concern for environmental protection and wildfire prevention. Since 2023, parking in forest car parks has been prohibited between 10 p.m. and 6 a.m. in order to limit nocturnal disturbance and the risk of fire ignition. This measure is part of a context in which the National Forests Office and local associations are seeking to manage increasing visitor numbers in a forest already subject to periods of heat and drought.

As early as spring 2026, several fires indicated an early increase in wildfire risk in the forest. Between 19 and 27 April 2026, at least seven fires were recorded amid low precipitation, pronounced drought and high visitor numbers associated with school holidays. The largest burned approximately 1.2 hectares. On the evening of 27 April, a fire broke out in the Belle-Croix area, near the Denecourt trail, and burned the shrub layer. The rocky and steep terrain made access difficult for emergency services, which operated for part of the night to contain the fire. Investigations were opened under judicial authority to determine the origins of the various fires. At the end of April, meteorological services rated the fire risk at 4 on a scale of 6, notably because of the abundance of dry or dead vegetation favourable to the spread of flames. In some areas, the presence of peat soils prolonged extinguishing operations and required flooding operations to prevent the fire from continuing underground. The early and repeated nature of the fires led state services to strengthen surveillance of the forest. Following a meeting held on 28 April between the Prefecture, National Police, Departmental Fire and Rescue Service (SDIS 77) and ONF, motorised and mounted patrols were strengthened, drones were deployed and an ONF mobile team was established to respond rapidly to certain fires. The firefighters' operational centre was also instructed to systematically alert command services to facilitate possible observations or arrests in the act.

=== Prefectural restrictions ===
On 24 June 2026, the Prefect of Seine-et-Marne, Pierre Ory, issued an order prohibiting public access to the Trois-Pignons area for the duration of Météo-France's red heatwave warning. The prohibition applied to forest roads, hiking trails and all plots within the designated area. The order was justified by the combination of high temperatures, low air humidity and a water deficit in vegetation, which increased the risk of fire ignition and favoured rapid spread. The area's rugged terrain and difficult access could also complicate the intervention of emergency services. This measure came amid severe deterioration in the forest's water conditions. The Forest of Fontainebleau experienced two successive heatwaves, at the end of May and during the final week of June 2026. In April, precipitation amounted to approximately 5 mm, compared with the usual 40 mm. This precipitation deficit was aggravated by the sandy nature of the soils, which retain little water and promote rapid drying of vegetation. At the end of June, temperatures locally exceeded 41 °C. Under these conditions, trees reduced their growth and seed production, while some deciduous trees could no longer supply their crowns with sufficient water. Since 2019, approximately 40% of deciduous trees in the forest have shown signs of stress on average. Scots pines, which are relatively adapted to drought, remain particularly sensitive to extreme heat, causing their needles to yellow, redden and fall.

After the first prohibition was lifted following the end of the June heatwave, the prefects of Seine-et-Marne and Essonne issued a new order prohibiting public access to the Trois-Pignons forest until and including 15 July 2026. The new closure was motivated by a very high risk of fire ignition and spread caused by high temperatures and pronounced drying of vegetation. The prohibition applied to all forest roads, hiking trails and forest plots. In Seine-et-Marne, it covered the territories of Noisy-sur-École, Arbonne-la-Forêt, Achères-la-Forêt and Le Vaudoué, as well as Milly-la-Forêt and Courances in Essonne.

=== Early July fires ===
On 8 July 2026, at approximately 1 p.m., a fire broke out in plot 713 of the Forest of Fontainebleau, in the Gorges d'Apremont area near the Brigands cave. The fire burned approximately 1.7 hectares of undergrowth. Its location in a rocky and steep area complicated access for emergency services and the delivery of water amid high temperatures. Nearly 200 firefighters took turns during the operation, with a maximum of 80 personnel deployed simultaneously. Water supplies came in particular from an underground tank at the Cépées crossroads and from resources provided by the municipalities of Barbizon and Fontainebleau. On the afternoon of 9 July, damping-down operations continued to prevent the fire from reigniting. The ONF filed a complaint and a police investigation was opened to determine the cause of the fire.

On 11 July 2026, at approximately 2:15 a.m., a fire broke out in the Gorges d'Apremont area, in a plot separate from the one affected on 8 July. The fire was approximately 500 m from the nearest accessible roads, within rocky terrain that made pedestrian access and firefighting particularly difficult. During the afternoon, a water bomber helicopter recently deployed to Seine-et-Marne was used against the fire. The aircraft made twelve drops after collecting water from the Seine at the Valvins bridge between Samois-sur-Seine and Avon. The aerial operation contained the fire at approximately 4.5 hectares. A reduced monitoring operation was maintained overnight and continued the following day to prevent the fire from restarting.

== Progression ==
=== Sunday, 12 July 2026 ===
On 12 July 2026, the Seine-et-Marne fire and rescue services were already deployed to several incidents in the department. Earlier that day, a vegetation fire broke out near Les Écrennes, close to Le Châtelet-en-Brie, causing traffic to be interrupted on the A5 autoroute between exits 16 and 17 because of smoke. In the late afternoon, the fire that began the series of fires examined in this article broke out alongside the A6 autoroute in the municipality of Noisy-sur-École, in the Trois-Pignons massif. The fire started on the motorway verge before spreading into the forest. Large plumes of smoke greatly reduced visibility and made traffic impossible on the affected section. About 40 firefighters were initially deployed.

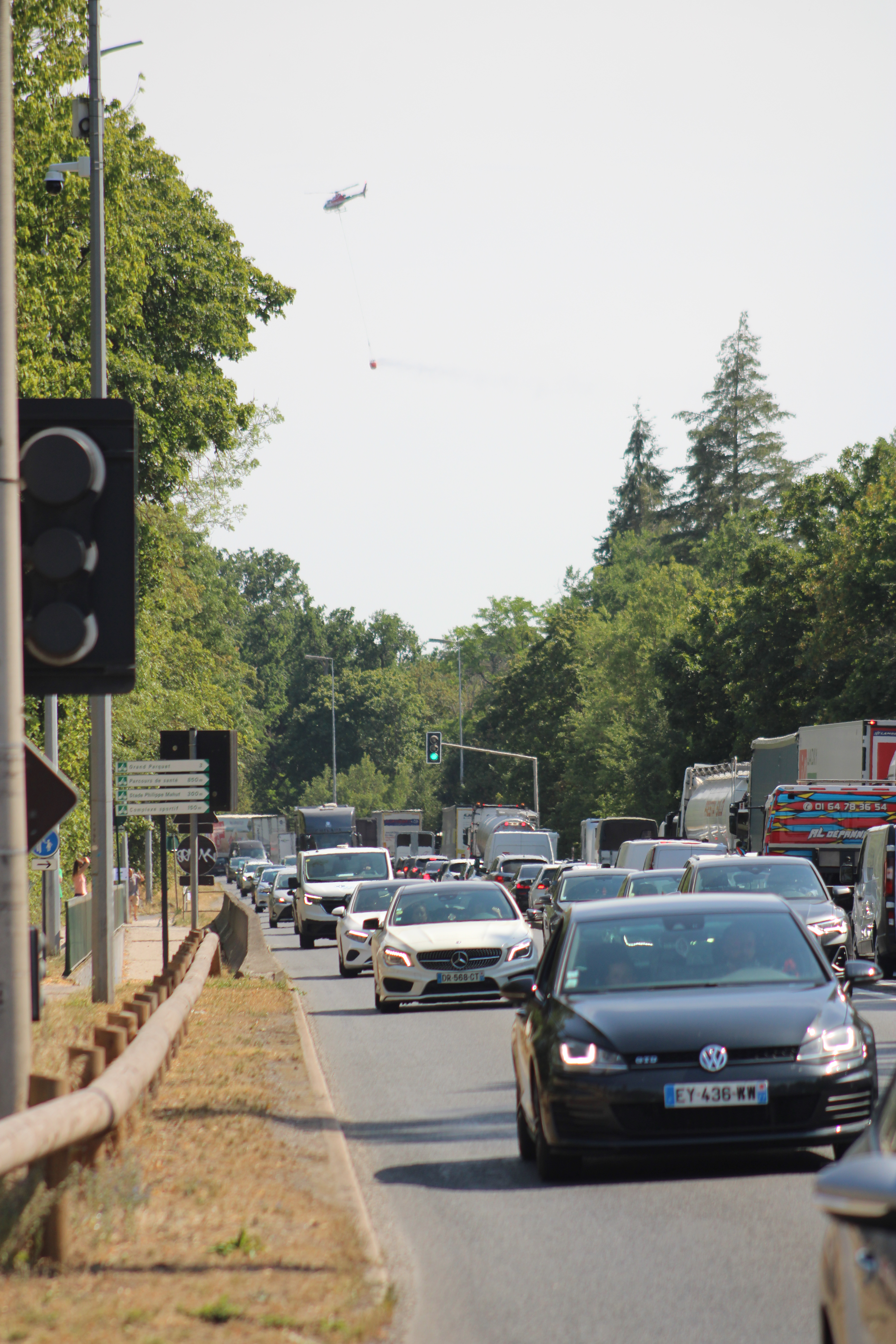
Traffic on Boulevard de Constance, west of Fontainebleau, following the closure of the A6 motorway. Photographed on 13 July 2026.

From approximately 6 p.m., the fire spread rapidly through the Trois-Pignons massif. Emergency services identified approximately six ignition points, two of them on opposite sides of the A6 autoroute. One front advanced from west to east in the direction of the wind, while another advanced in the opposite direction. The A6 was closed to traffic for several hours because of the proximity of the flames and heavy smoke. Detours caused major traffic problems on the secondary road network, particularly at the entrance to Fontainebleau and at the Obelisk roundabout. A few hours after the fire began, the area burned was estimated at 16 hectares. Two Dash aircraft (Bombardier 8-Q400-MR) and two water bomber helicopters were deployed to reinforce ground resources, with each Dash capable of dropping approximately 10 tonnes of water per sortie. The deployment represented the first operational use of such aircraft against a fire in the Île-de-France region.

In the evening, the area burned was provisionally estimated at more than 800 hectares. A command post was established in the forest to coordinate operations. Nearly 400 firefighters, mainly from Seine-et-Marne, Essonne and Yvelines, were progressively deployed. Reinforcements from Val-d'Oise, comprising about 100 firefighters and 20 vehicles, were announced for the following day. Twelve farmers also helped supply firefighting vehicles using water tanks. As the fire advanced, approximately 100 people were evacuated from Achères-la-Forêt and about 15 from Le Vaudoué. They were accommodated in gymnasiums and municipal halls. Authorities stated that firefighting and monitoring operations would continue for several days. The presence of several separate fires led the National Gendarmerie to examine the possibility of deliberate ignition. At this stage, this remained an investigative hypothesis.

=== Monday, 13 July 2026 ===
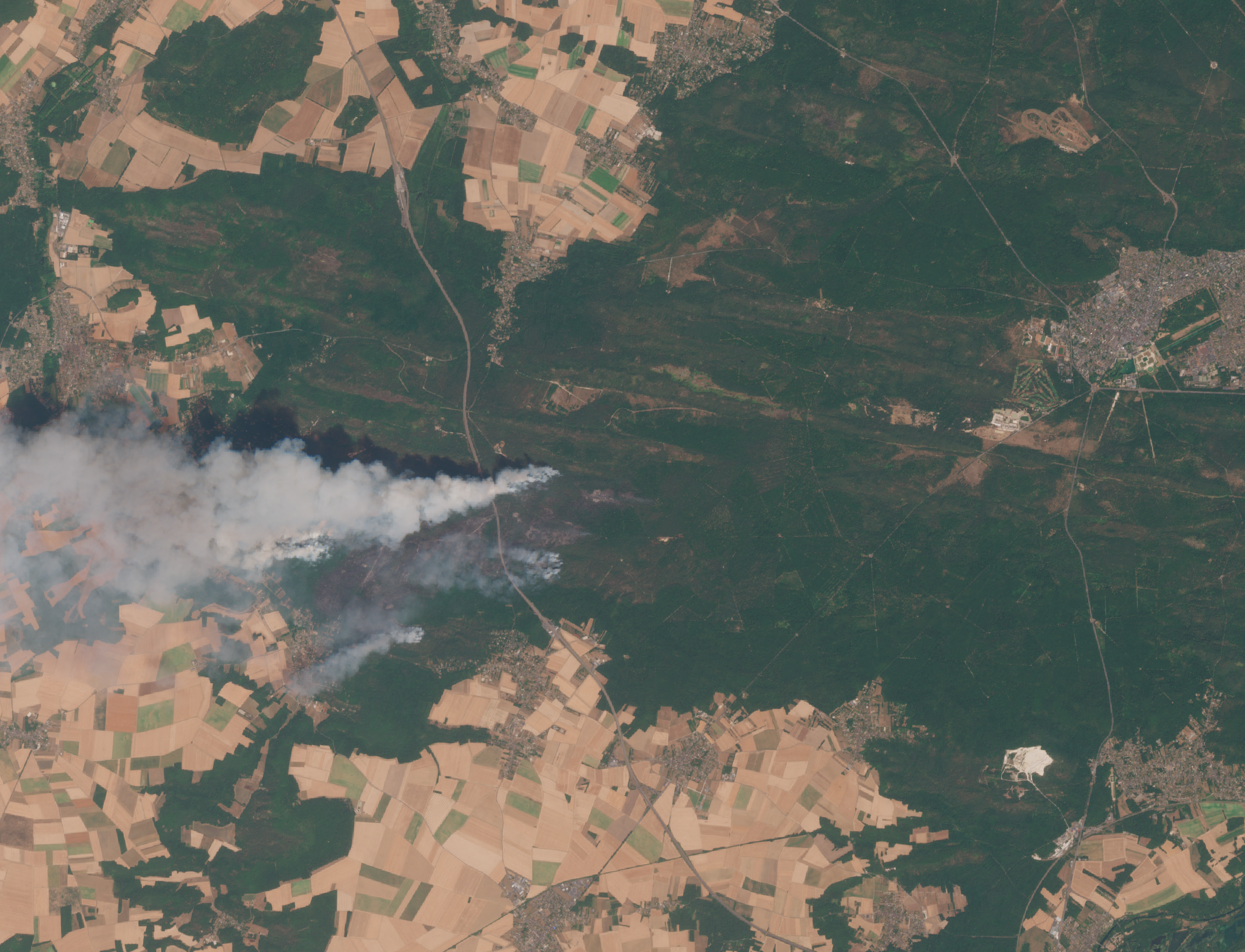
Satellite view of the first fire area. Photographed on 13 July 2026 by a Sentinel-2 satellite.

During the night of 12–13 July 2026, some residents of the two partially evacuated municipalities had to leave their homes because of the advancing fire. In Le Vaudoué, a multipurpose hall was opened to accommodate displaced people, centralise information and arrange accommodation, with some people staying with relatives. On the morning of 13 July, evacuated residents were still not authorised to return home. Authorities maintained the measure until the fire was contained because of persistent toxic and irritating smoke. Homes in the area had not been reached by the flames. During the day, thick smoke reached Le Vaudoué and Arbonne-la-Forêt, where a smell of burning remained noticeable. In Le Vaudoué, some residents wore surgical masks to limit their exposure to smoke. In Arbonne-la-Forêt, residents monitored the fire's progress and remained prepared to evacuate, with several preparing their belongings and vehicles while awaiting possible instructions from authorities.

In the morning, Minister of the Interior Laurent Nuñez travelled to Noisy-sur-École, where he held a press conference on the development of the fire and rescue operations. He said that approximately ten ignition points had been identified within an area of 1,000 m² and suggested that these elements could direct the investigation towards deliberate ignition. He stressed, however, that the investigation still had to confirm or rule out that hypothesis. The public prosecutor of Fontainebleau also referred to evidence considered troubling, while stating that human intervention had not yet been established. Nuñez also announced that approximately 900 people had been evacuated. He attributed the exceptional scale of the fire to drought conditions and stated that even if the fire were quickly contained, firefighting and monitoring operations would have to continue for several days or even weeks. President Emmanuel Macron also stated on X at noon that "all resources are mobilised".

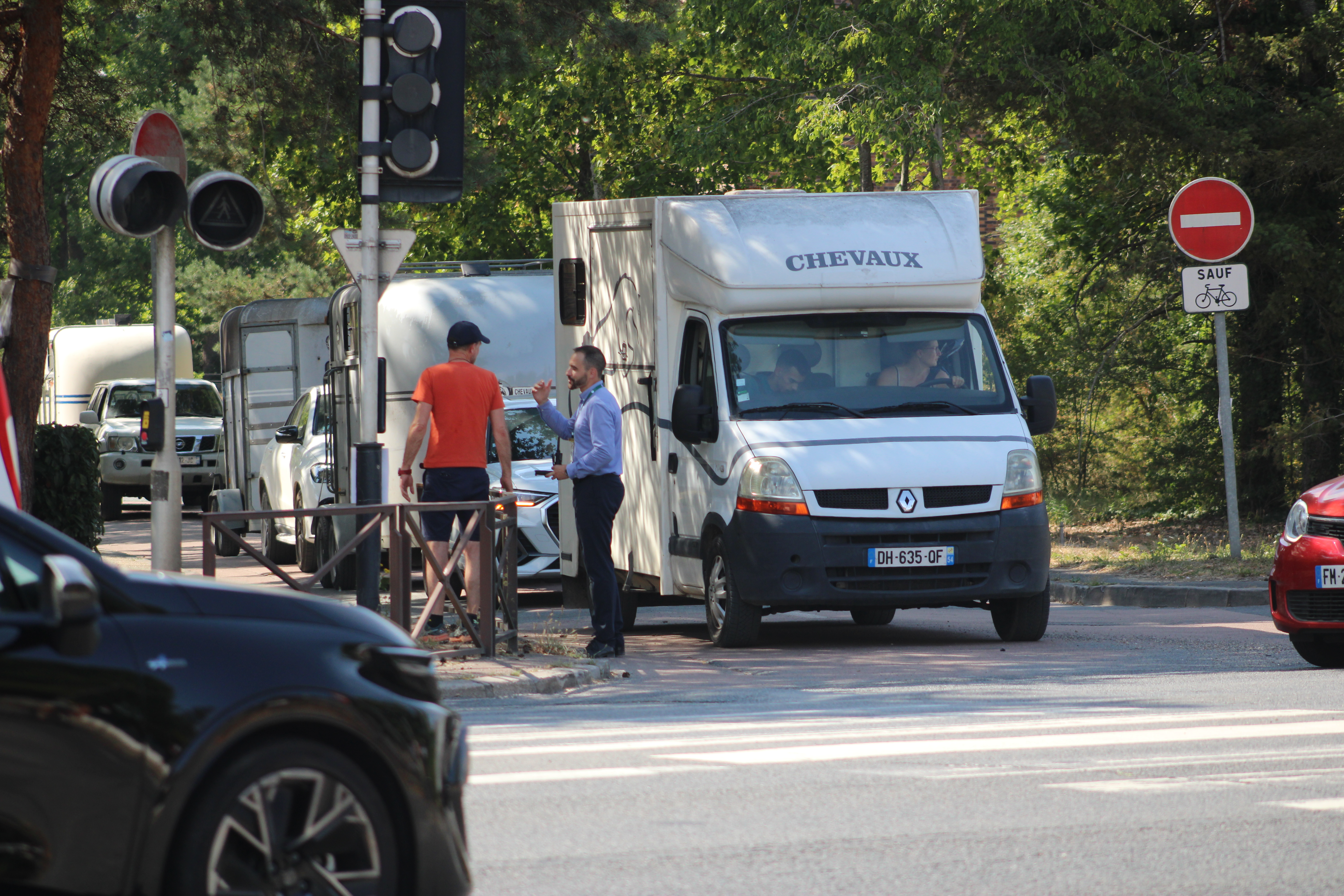
Security officer informing people of the closure of the INSEAD area, with vehicles evacuating horses. Photographed at 16:49.

In the afternoon, a change in wind direction pushed the fire towards Fontainebleau. New fires were observed in the Faisanderie area from approximately 3 p.m., behind the campus of INSEAD, leading firefighters to redeploy some of their resources. Authorities maintained the provisional estimate of approximately 800 hectares burned. The Palace of Fontainebleau closed its gardens and suspended visits to facilitate aerial operations. Water-bomber helicopters refuelled from the canal and Carp Pond on the estate, while water-bomber aircraft flew over the municipality before making their drops. Two additional Canadair water bombers were announced as reinforcements. Following the appearance of the new fire, INSEAD ultimately evacuated its entire campus as a precaution. Students, faculty, employees and visitors on the site were moved to safety and access to the campus was suspended.

At 10 p.m., the prefecture estimated that the fires had burned more than 1,300 hectares in the Fontainebleau forest, including approximately 1,200 hectares around Noisy-sur-École and 120 hectares around the Faisanderie. No deaths or injuries had been reported and material damage remained limited. More than 850 firefighters were deployed, with military resources reinforcing the operation from midday. In the evening, the Minister of the Interior announced the arrest of two people suspected of having a connection with the ignition of the fires in the Fontainebleau forest; the investigation into their origin continued.

=== Tuesday, 14 July 2026 ===
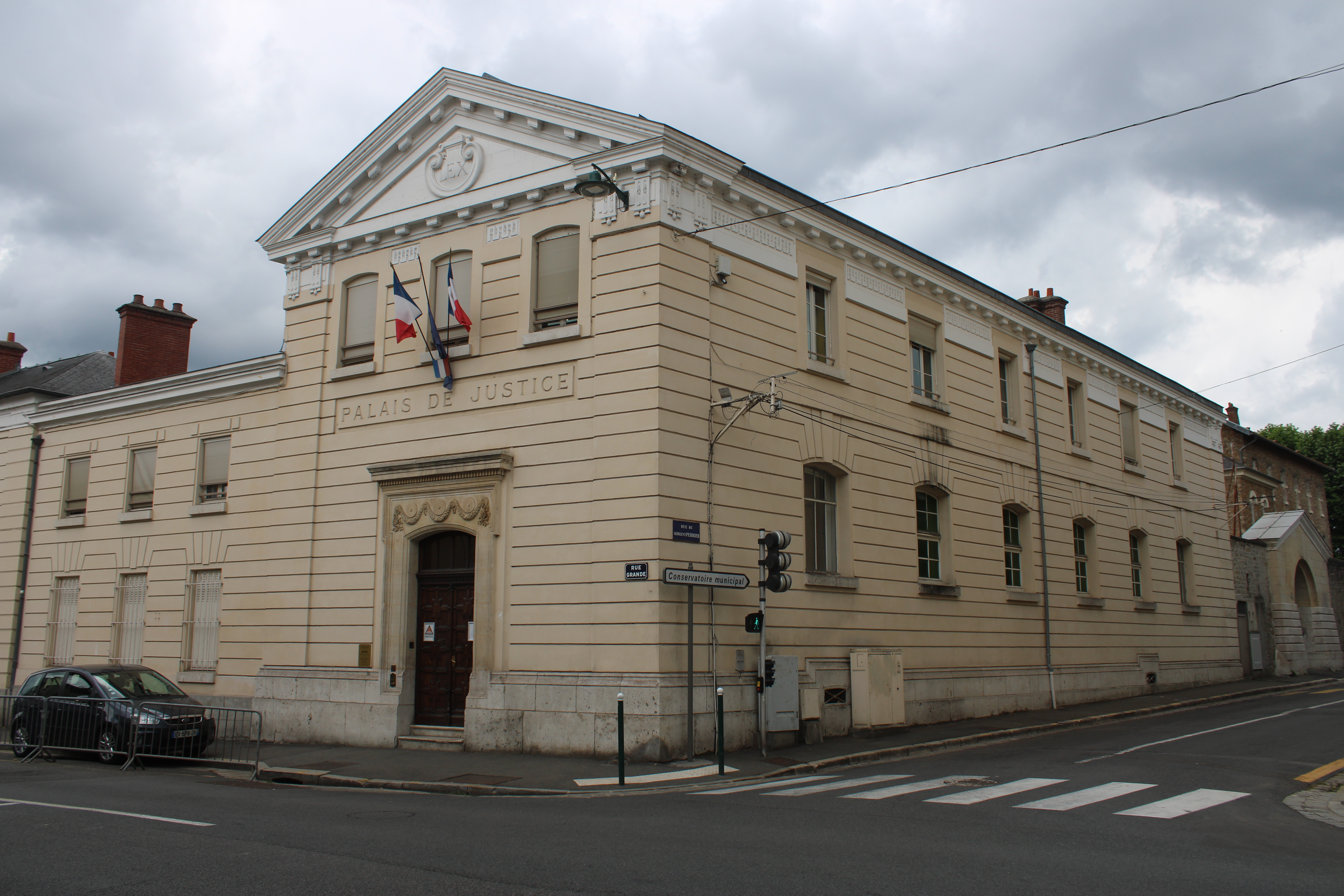
Fontainebleau courthouse. Photographed on 20 June 2021.

On 14 July 2026, the Fontainebleau public prosecutor's office announced that it had opened a flagrante delicto investigation into destruction by fire of woodland, forest, heathland, maquis or plantation capable of causing harm to persons. The investigation was entrusted to the Paris Research Section and Fontainebleau Research Brigade, assisted by criminal identification technicians and experts specialising in determining the causes and circumstances of fires. The multiplicity of fire fronts led investigators to examine both accidental and deliberate causes. Because the fire was still burning and several areas were inaccessible, initial observations were conducted mainly on the A6 motorway. The possibility that a fire had been started by work being carried out close to the motorway was also investigated. Several people were taken into police custody. One man born in 2007, a volunteer firefighter in Fontainebleau, admitted to lighting twigs in Arbonne-la-Forêt with a lighter and petrol. A second man, also born in 2007, admitted to accidentally starting a fire by throwing a cigarette near the Grand Parquet, in the Faisanderie area. No connection between the two men had been established at that time. A third suspect, born in 1975, was taken into custody following a report near a location where a fire had started or reignited. Another detention concerned a man born in 2005, arrested as part of investigations into a fire near the Faisanderie in Fontainebleau. Two other people were also taken into custody that morning. Evidence collection and observations continued in Arbonne-la-Forêt and were to be extended to other areas once they were secured.

=== Wednesday, 15 July 2026 ===
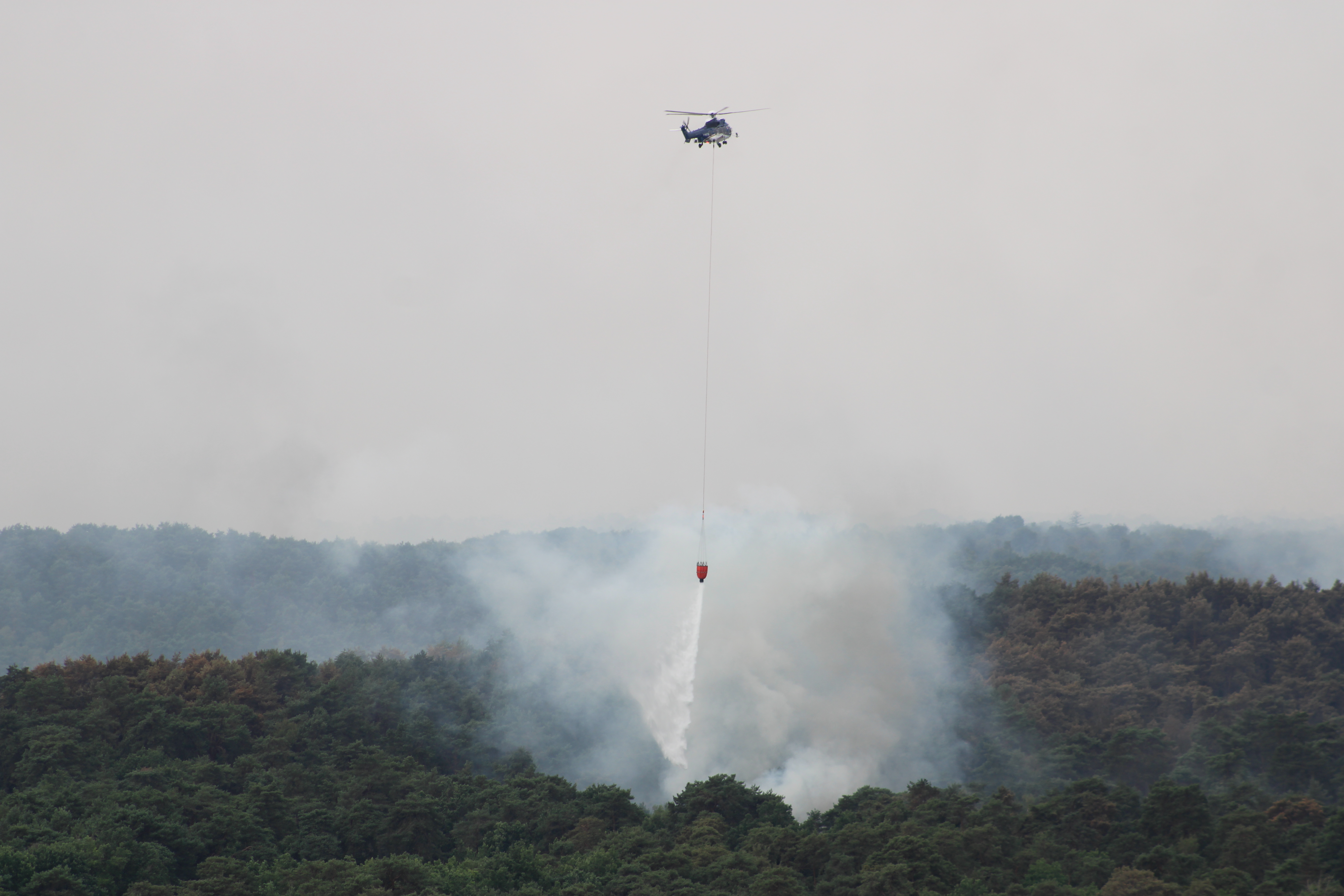
Helicopter operating on the Faisanderie fire. Photographed at 11:09.

On 15 July, the main fire was declared "contained", although several flare-ups were still reported. Three new fires were notably observed at the Grand Parquet, in the Faisanderie area. To allow emergency services to operate, several departmental roads were closed to traffic: the RD 301 between the RD 409 and RD 152, the RD 16 between Milly-la-Forêt and Le Vaudoué, the RD 152 between the Obelisk and the Ury exit, and the RD 64 along the A6 motorway. Detours were established. The A6 remained closed in both directions between exits 13 and 15.

The same day, the public prosecutor's office requested that the two 18-year-old men who had admitted involvement in separate fire starts be held in pre-trial detention, one at Arbonne-la-Forêt and the other near the Grand Parquet. The first, a volunteer firefighter, was prosecuted over the Arbonne-la-Forêt fire, while the second was implicated in the fire caused by a cigarette near the Grand Parquet. During his appearance before the judge responsible for pre-trial detention, the volunteer firefighter nevertheless retracted his initial statements and denied starting a fire. He said he had confessed during police custody because of stress. The judge nevertheless ordered pre-trial detention, citing in particular variations in his statements and the risk of reoffending.

=== Thursday, 16 July 2026 ===
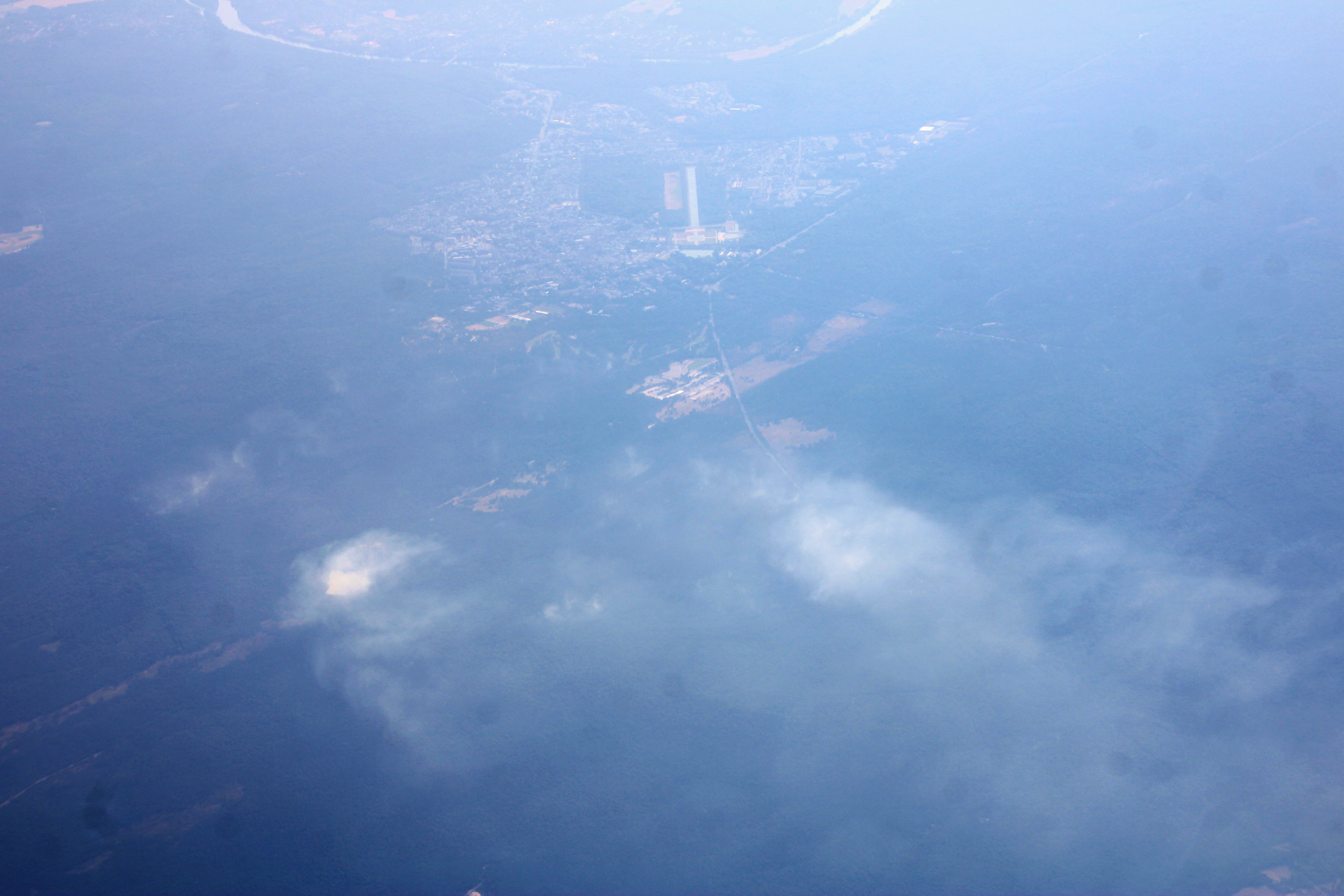
Smoke seen from the forest, with the Fontainebleau-Avon urban area in the background. Photographed at 9:36 from a Paris–Nice flight.

On the morning of 16 July 2026, President Emmanuel Macron was scheduled to travel to Fontainebleau to meet elected officials and people involved in fighting the fires. The visit, announced by the Élysée Palace in a statement the previous evening, was intended "to show his support for all the women and men mobilised to fight the fires".

Deployment of fire engines in the Trois-Pignons forest during the night of 16–17 July 2026

=== Monday, 27 July 2026 ===
Emmanuel Macron called for people to "remain united" and "fight to win the battle" against the fire, while acknowledging that people must "remain humble" and that "the coming weeks will be hard". He said that "we do not conduct the lessons-learned exercise in the middle of the battle. We remain united and fight to win the battle everywhere".

=== Wednesday, 29 July 2026 ===
A fire reignited on Wednesday at 4:20 p.m. It was subsequently contained, and 7 hectares had burned.

== Response ==
=== Response during the active phase ===
==== Municipal response in Fontainebleau ====
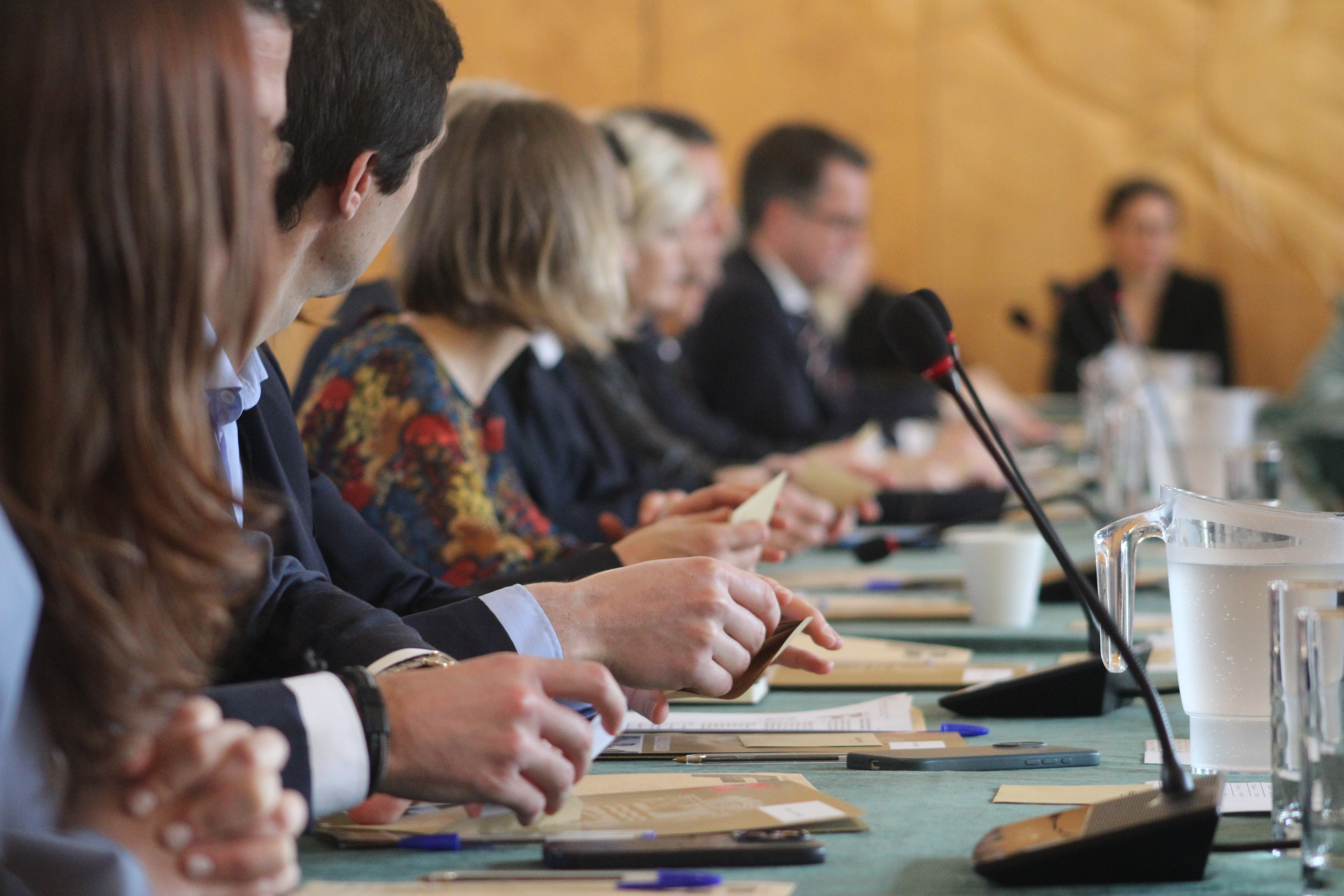
The municipal council renewed in March 2026, at the city hall, during the election of mayor Julien Gondard. Photographed on 21 March 2026.

From 13 July 2026, the City of Fontainebleau activated its municipal safeguarding plan (PCS) after a fire appeared in the Faisanderie area near the urban area. A crisis unit was established at Fontainebleau City Hall to monitor the development of the fires, coordinate municipal services and support rescue operations. The municipality regularly disseminated information to residents, centralised calls and offers of assistance, participated in road closures and prepared for a possible evacuation. The Lucien-Martinel gymnasium was converted into a rear base and rest area for firefighters.

==== Citizen response ====
Residents and businesses also supplied food, water, hygiene products and various equipment for emergency services. Several hundred donations were collected in Fontainebleau and Soisy-sur-École, while collection points were opened in Samoreau and Soignolles-en-Brie. Some supplies were transported to Maisse, where a former commercial establishment housed emergency teams and the departmental civil security reserve. Because of the volume of donations, SDIS 77 and the City of Fontainebleau temporarily suspended collection on 15 July to organise distribution of supplies already received and adapt donations to needs expressed in the field.

Farmers from neighbouring municipalities and nearby departments also participated in the operations. About 100 of them provided tractors and water tanks to supply firefighting vehicles near intervention areas. This organisation reduced the need for trucks to travel to distant water points and reduced waiting times. On the evening of 14 July, farmers constructed a temporary water reservoir from straw bales in one hour for use by water-bomber helicopters. They also worked in fields near the fire to turn over the soil and bury straw in order to slow the fire's spread.

==== Response for animals ====
The response also involved livestock threatened by smoke and ash. On 13 July, approximately 80 dogs housed at the Arche d'Ury were evacuated, with the agreement of the Prefecture and their owners, to a former equestrian centre in Bois-le-Roi. Heat in the stalls led to a second transfer on 14 July to the Léo-Lagrange gymnasium and Jean-Gabin cinema in Champagne-sur-Seine, both made available by the municipality. About 30 volunteers, supported by several animal protection associations, provided reception, monitoring and care. Residents supplied cages, water, air conditioners, food and bedding. A Belgian team specialising in animal rescue also joined the operation. The most vulnerable animals were placed in the air-conditioned cinema and treated with the help of a veterinarian and animal keeper; several dogs showed signs of stress, dehydration or hyperthermia. Volunteers organised continuous shifts to monitor and exercise the animals for several days.

From the evening of 12 July, owners, equestrian centres and private individuals with horse trailers organised, particularly through social media, the evacuation of threatened horses in the areas of Le Vaudoué, Achères-la-Forêt and Noisy-sur-École. Approximately 150 horses from seven threatened stables and stud farms were evacuated on 13 July to the Grand Parquet in Fontainebleau. When that site itself had to be evacuated because of the advancing fire in the Faisanderie area, the horses were distributed among several facilities in the department. In Châtenay-sur-Seine, the Cibou et Compagnie association made boxes and paddocks available and accommodated two horses transferred from the Grand Parquet. Local businesses also provided feed for evacuated horses. At the same time, an operation to search for and rescue wildlife affected by the fire was planned once emergency services permitted access to the forest.

Citizen mobilisation for animals reached unprecedented levels, with volunteers joining WhatsApp channels created by the animal-protection association FUTUR, bringing together as many as 6,000 people. The federation mainly helped manage the influx of volunteers, redirect them towards collections for care centres and firefighters, and select people with veterinary skills or suitable transport capabilities to conduct rescue operations on the edges of affected areas.

=== Response after the fires ===
==== Financial mobilisation ====
On 16 July 2026, an emergency fundraising campaign was launched by the French Heritage Foundation, in partnership with the ONF and several local authorities and institutions, to finance initial safety operations, biodiversity conservation and restoration of burned areas. With an initial target of €2 million, the campaign quickly attracted substantial financial support: five days after its launch, more than 5,200 donors had contributed more than €630,000. The Île-de-France regional government simultaneously announced that it would match donations euro for euro.

==== Campaign to suspend hunting ====
On 14 July 2026, a petition entitled "No guns on the ashes!" was launched on Change.org by Bruno Valentin, a resident of Cantal. It called for hunting to be suspended for at least three years in forest areas affected by the summer 2026 fires, as well as for protected areas to be established around burned zones to encourage the regeneration of fauna and flora. By 31 July, it had collected nearly 330,000 signatures. The Seine-et-Marne Hunters' Federation said it intended to adapt hunting quotas in the affected areas while maintaining certain population-control operations, particularly for wild boar.

==== Campaign concerning access to the forest ====
Published in the magazine Grimper on 17 August 2026, amid the prolonged closure of the forest following the summer 2026 fires, the statement "The Fontainebleau Call: for a living and free forest" expressed concern among part of the climbing community about access restrictions and proposed post-fire regulation measures. Supported by more than 100 climbers and climbing personalities, it advocated maintaining free and responsible access to the forest, criticised the placing of blame on users in the debate over the fires, and called for greater emphasis on risk prevention and infrastructure responsibility in protecting the forest.

== Economic impact ==
From the first days of the fires, tourism professionals in the Pays de Fontainebleau reported the first economic effects of the fires and restrictions on access to the forest. Laurent Roussel, president of the tourist office, reported "many cancellations, but not all", mainly affecting visitors coming for outdoor activities, particularly bouldering and hiking. Accommodation providers serving this clientele were directly affected by the closure of the forest, while establishments outside the burned areas mainly reported a slowdown in new bookings. The director of a guesthouse approximately 20 kilometres from Fontainebleau said that "the telephone no longer rings", despite existing reservations remaining in place. Professionals also sought to prevent the destination from acquiring an image of being entirely devastated. Roussel stressed that "people must not think Fontainebleau is closed", noting that the Palace of Fontainebleau, the villages of Barbizon, Samois-sur-Seine and Bourron-Marlotte, the banks of the Seine, businesses and cultural activities remained accessible. Summer events continued, including events at the Palace of Fontainebleau, the departmental Museum of Barbizon Painters and the Grand Parquet. Attendance at equestrian events nevertheless remained vulnerable because of the combined effects of the heatwave and fires.

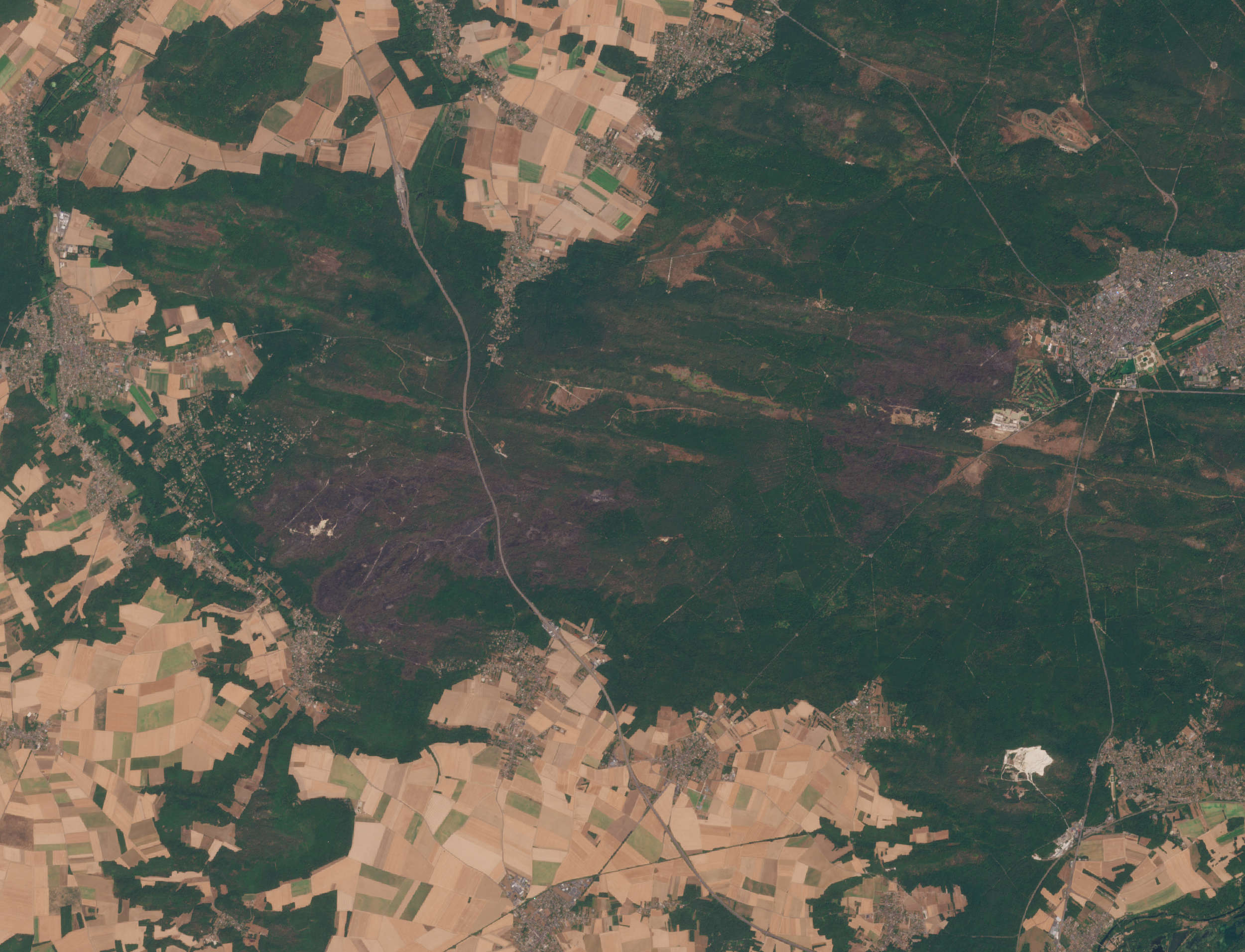
Satellite view of the forest after the fires were contained. Photographed on 20 July 2026 by a Sentinel-2 satellite.

In Barbizon, the closure of a large part of the Forest of Fontainebleau nevertheless caused a sharp decline in tourism during the remainder of the month, on which a significant share of local economic activity depends. Mayor Gérard Taponat estimated that approximately 85% of visitors came primarily for the natural environment of the forest and reported cancellations of up to 80% at some establishments. The hospitality industry, restaurants, shops and tourist accommodation experienced significant losses, estimated by some professionals at nearly 30% of turnover, although the effects varied between businesses. On 21 July 2026, the municipality brought together economic stakeholders to develop a recovery plan based on stronger communication about the accessibility of the village, distinct from the ban on entering the forest, together with commercial measures and possible local aid. Constituency member of parliament Arnaud Saint-Martin also announced plans to seek support from the Regional and Departmental Councils for affected businesses. Local stakeholders hoped for a gradual return of visitors from September.

== Assessment ==
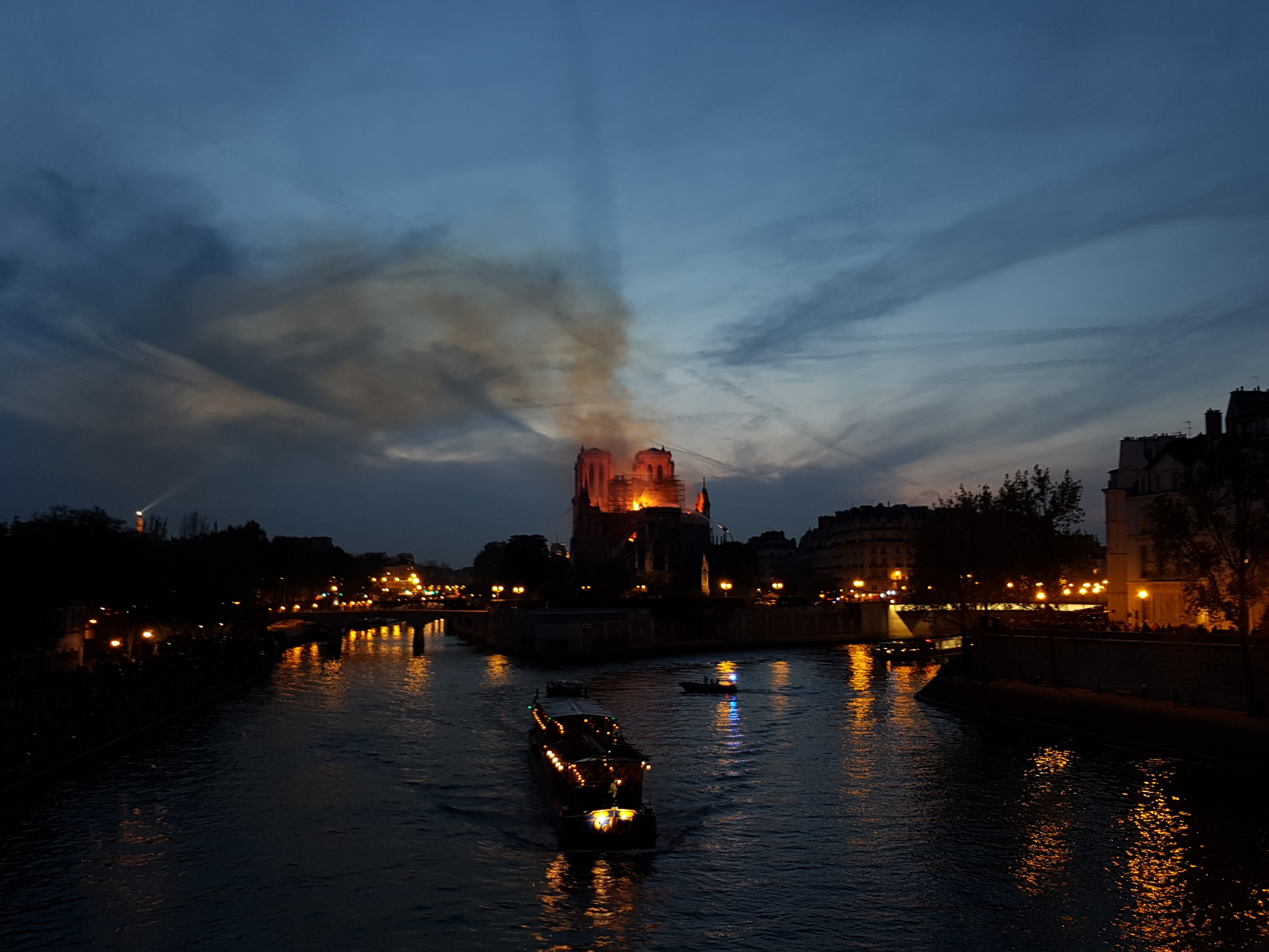
The Notre-Dame de Paris fire of 2019 was a cultural comparison invoked in connection with the Fontainebleau forest fires.

While the fires were still ongoing, Rémi Savazzi, head of the ONF's national forest-fire defence unit, said on 15 July 2026 that 2026 could accelerate the strengthening of wildfire prevention and response policies. He stressed the need to adapt public resources to the expansion of wildfire risk into northern France and to anticipate the effects of climate change on the choice of tree species when restoring affected areas.

As of 15 July 2026, the Seine-et-Marne Prefecture stated that "the fires have, at this stage, burned nearly 2,000 hectares": 1,500 hectares in the Noisy-sur-École area and 450 hectares in the Faisanderie area.

By the end of July 2026, the total area affected was 2,000 hectares.

== Cultural representations ==
Soon after the fires began and received widespread media coverage, they became the subject of several press cartoons. In particular, cartoonist Chaunu devoted a drawing to the event on 14 July 2026, published in Ouest-France. Plantu published a cartoon the following day entitled "Notre-Dame de Fontainebleau", in which the burning forest takes the form of Notre-Dame de Paris. The comparison with the 2019 fire was made several times, including by MP Frédéric Valletoux in the National Assembly that day, with the Paris cathedral and the Fontainebleau forest regarded as important national monuments.
