= Tullia Zevi =

Italian journalist and writer (1919–2011)

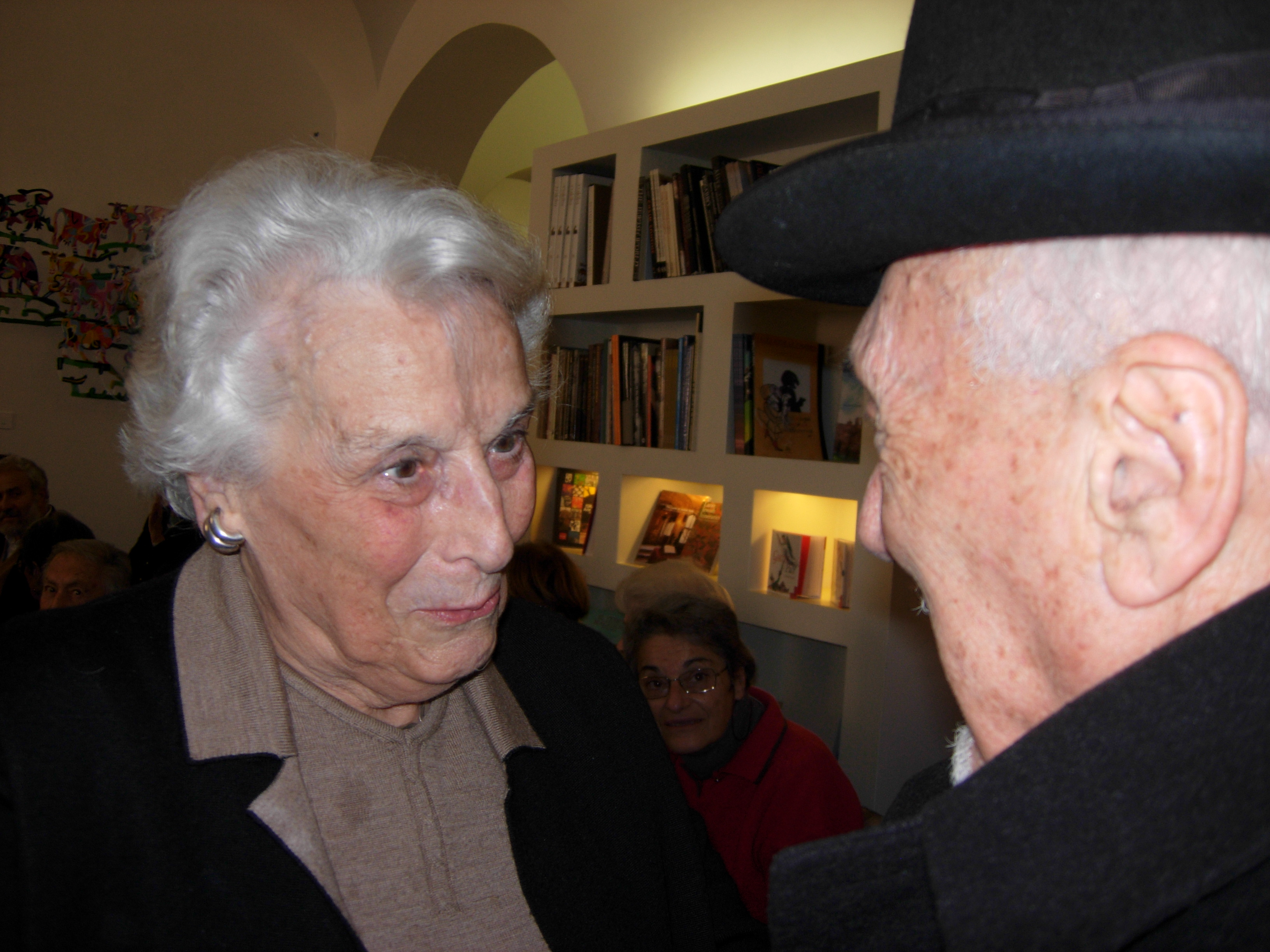
- Tullia Zevi and Elio Toaff
- Born: Tullia Calabi; 2 February 1919; Milan, Italy
- Died: 22 January 2011 (aged 91); Rome, Italy
- Occupation: Journalist
- Spouse: Bruno Zevi

Tullia Zevi (née Calabi; 2 February 1919 – 22 January 2011) was an Italian journalist and writer. Zevi's family fled Italy to France and then to the US after the rise of fascism in the 1930s. While in New York City, she married Bruno Zevi. She returned to Europe in 1946, and was one of the few women journalists to report the Nuremberg Trials. On her return to Italy, she played a major role in Interfaith dialog, and was active in Italian Centre-left politics. Zevi was president of the Union of Italian Jewish Communities from 1983 to 1998.

== Biography ==
Zevi was born in Milan, one of four children of an upper middle-class Jewish-Italian family.

Her father Giuseppe Calabi was a lawyer and prominent anti-fascist. Her brother was the mathematician Eugenio Calabi.

Zevi studied philosophy at the University of Milan and studied music at the Milan Conservatory. When the Fascist government of Italy passed anti-Jewish laws, Zevi was on holiday in Switzerland with her family. Later they moved to France, where Zevi continued her studies at the Sorbonne in Paris. Anticipating the Fall of France, the Calabi family emigrated to the United States, where she joined the antifascist Mazzini Society and considered Gaetano Salvemini her teacher. In New York she met architect Bruno Zevi. The couple married in 1940.

As a journalist, Zevi reported the Nuremberg Trials. Zevi returned to Italy in 1946.

Zevi was an Italian correspondent for London-based newspaper The Jewish Chronicle from 1948 to 1963 and Israeli newspaper Maariv from 1960 to 1993.

== Awards ==
Zevi was awarded the Knighthood of the Great Cross in 1993.
