= Centro de Arte y Comunicación =

Argentinian arts organization

The Centro de Arte y Comunicación (CAyC) was an arts organization based in Buenos Aires, Argentina, that was instrumental in creating an international arts movement based on the ideas of systems art within conceptual art.

== History ==
In August 1968, CAyC was established as a multidisciplinary workshop by Víctor Grippo, Jacques Bedel, Luis Fernando Benedit, Alfredo Portillos, Clorindo Testa, Jorge Glusberg, and Jorge González. Jorge Glusberg was the main leader associated with CAyC.

In 1971, the "Grupo de los Trece" was created by Polish theater director Jerzy Grotowski. There were 13 artists who made up the group: Jacques Bedel, Luis Fernándo Benedit, Gregorio Dujovny, Carlos Ginsburg, Jorge Glusberg, Victor Grippo, Jorge González Mir, Vicente Lucas Marotta, Luis Pazos, Alfredo Portillos, Juan Carlos Romero, Julio Teich, and Horacio Zabala. Additional artists who later joined were Leopoldo Maler and Clorindo Testa. In 1975, the group were formally named the "Grupo CAyC."

The work was centered around the concept of "Arte de Sistemas" or Systemic Art, as well as cybernetics in Argentina.

In 1972, the "Scuola de Altos Estudios del CAyC" aka "Escuela de Altos Estudios" / "Escuela de Altos Estudios del Centro de Arte y Comunicación" was founded.

In the seventies CAyC became an international center for the Pop art-culture and the famous Museo de Arquitectura.

Well-known teachers at CAyC have included Justus Dahinden and Mario Botta.

From 1968 until his death in early 2012, Jorge Glusberg was the Director of CAyC.

== Selected exhibitions ==
- 1972: Art Systems in Latin America, Centro de Arte y Comunicación (Buenos Aires, Argentina)
- 1973: Antonio Dias, Centro de Arte y Comunicación (Buenos Aires, Argentina)
- 1973: Arte Contemporânea Brasileira, Centro de Arte y Comunicación (Buenos Aires, Argentina)
- 1973: Expo-Projeção 73, Centro de Arte y Comunicación (Buenos Aires, Argentina)
- 1974: Festival Experimental, Centro de Arte y Comunicación (Buenos Aires, Argentina)
- 1974: Vanguardia Brasileña, Centro de Arte y Comunicación (Buenos Aires, Argentina)
- 1974/1975: Art & Systems in Latin America, ICA - Institute of Contemporary Arts (London, Argentina)
- 1975: Julio Plaza, Centro de Arte y Comunicación (Buenos Aires, Argentina)
- 1975: Regina Silveira, Centro de Arte y Comunicación (Buenos Aires, Argentina)
- 1975: Bernardo Krasniansky, Centro de Arte y Comunicación (Buenos Aires, Argentina)
- 1976: 20 Artistas Brasileños, Centro de Arte y Comunicación (Buenos Aires, Argentina)
- 1977: Regina Silveira, Centro de Arte y Comunicación (Buenos Aires, Argentina)
- 1977: Image and Words, Centro de Arte y Comunicación (Buenos Aires, Argentina)
- 1979: Ocupación Topológica, Centro de Arte y Comunicación (Buenos Aires, Argentina)
- 1980: Sérgio de Camargo, Centro de Arte y Comunicación (Buenos Aires, Argentina)
- 1985: Nueva Pintura Brasileña, Centro de Arte y Comunicación (Buenos Aires, Argentina)
