= William Dunkel =

Swiss architect and painter

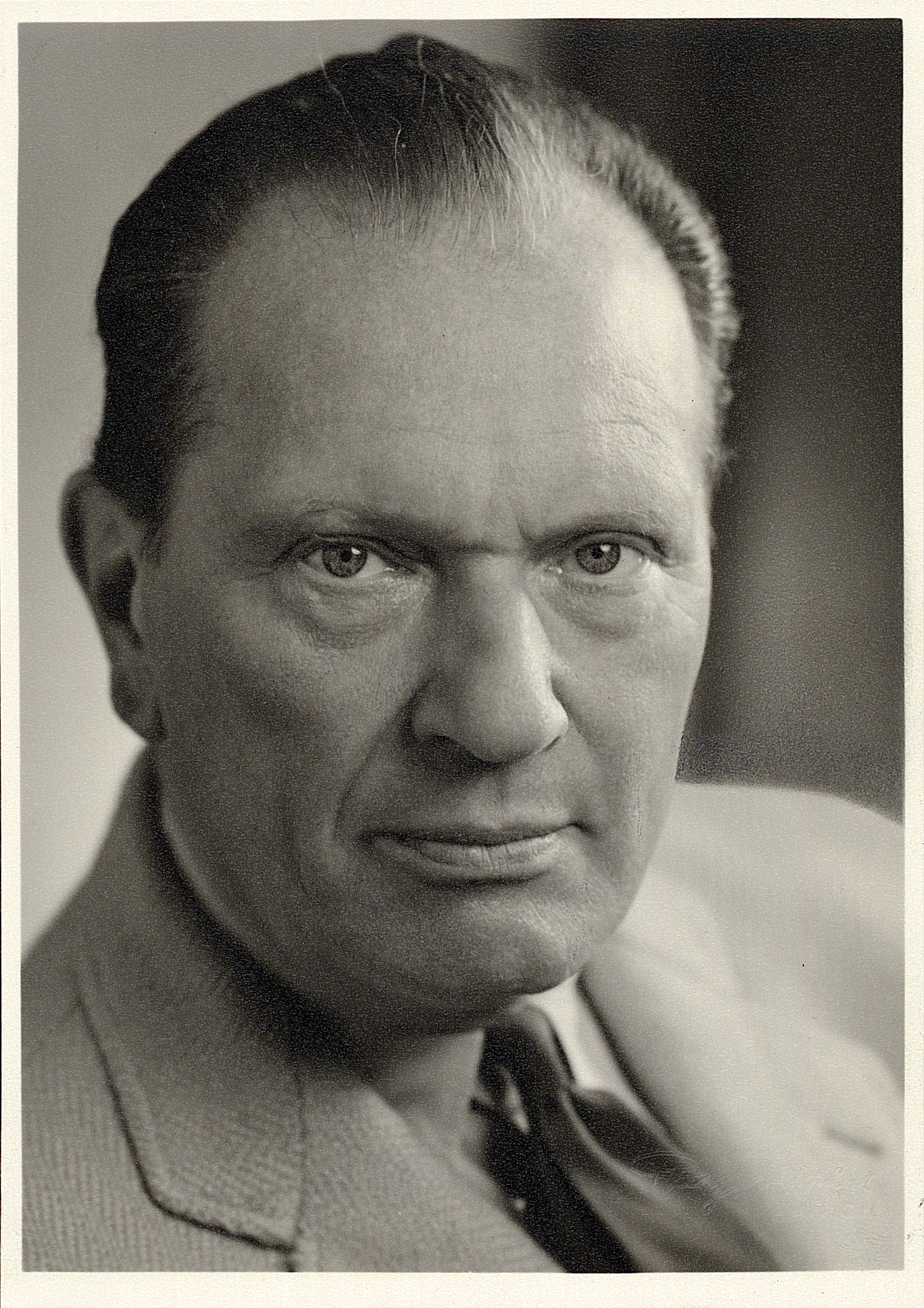
- William Dunkel, 1953
- Born: 26 May 1893; New Jersey, US
- Died: 10 September 1980; Kilchberg, Zürich, Switzerland
- Occupation(s): Architect, painter, university teacher

William Dunkel (born New Jersey 26 March 1893, died Kilchberg, ZH 10 September 1980) was a Swiss architect and painter. He worked in Germany until 1929 when he relocated to Switzerland upon obtaining a teaching job at the ETH (technical university) in Zürich.

Dunkel was born in 1893 in the US. His parents, Jacob Dunkel and Berta Marie Dunkel, née Kruse, were Swiss, and William grew up in Buenos Aires and Lausanne. In 1912 he started to study architecture in Germany at the Dresden University of Technology. He received his doctorate from Dresden in 1917 from Cornelius Gurlitt, for a dissertation entitled "Beiträge zur Entwicklung des Städtebaues in den Vereinigten Staaten von Amerika" ("Contributions to the development of town planning in America")

Because of the dire state of the economy, Dunkel's first work after the First World War was not as an architect but as an advertisement artist in Düsseldorf. At this time he was able to network with other artists such as Paul Klee, Otto Dix, Max Liebermann and Oskar Kokoschka. As an artist Dunkel would in the end leave behind him a very substantial body of work.

In 1923 Dunkel opened his own architecture practice in Düsseldorf. Winning some competitive tenders and prizes, he was able to draw attention to himself. In 1926 he married Emita Gschwind. His appointment to a teaching post at the ETH (technical university) in Zürich followed in 1929. Here his students would include Max Frisch, Alberto Camenzind, Justus Dahinden and Jakob Zweifel.

Like Le Corbusier and Walter Gropius, William Dunkel was a representative of the Neues Bauen school of architecture (sometimes translated in English as the New Objectivity school, although broadly agreed definitions of who represented which architectural movement are hard to find in either of the respective languages). The style was much used in twentieth century Switzerland. Among the better known of Dunkel's contributions are the Orion Auto-factory (1929) in Zürich and his own home in the city's Kilchberg quarter (1932). Nevertheless, two of his firm's most ambitious designs for public buildings remained unbuilt because they were rejected in cantonal referendums: the 60,000 seat "Oktogon stadium" (1953, actually designed by Dunkel's assistant, Justus Dahinden) and a new city theatre (1961) for Zürich, inspired by Alvar Aalto's theatre in Essen.

William Dunkel died on 10 September 1980 in Kilchberg, Zürich.
