= Yasmin Shariff =

Ugandan architect (born 1956)

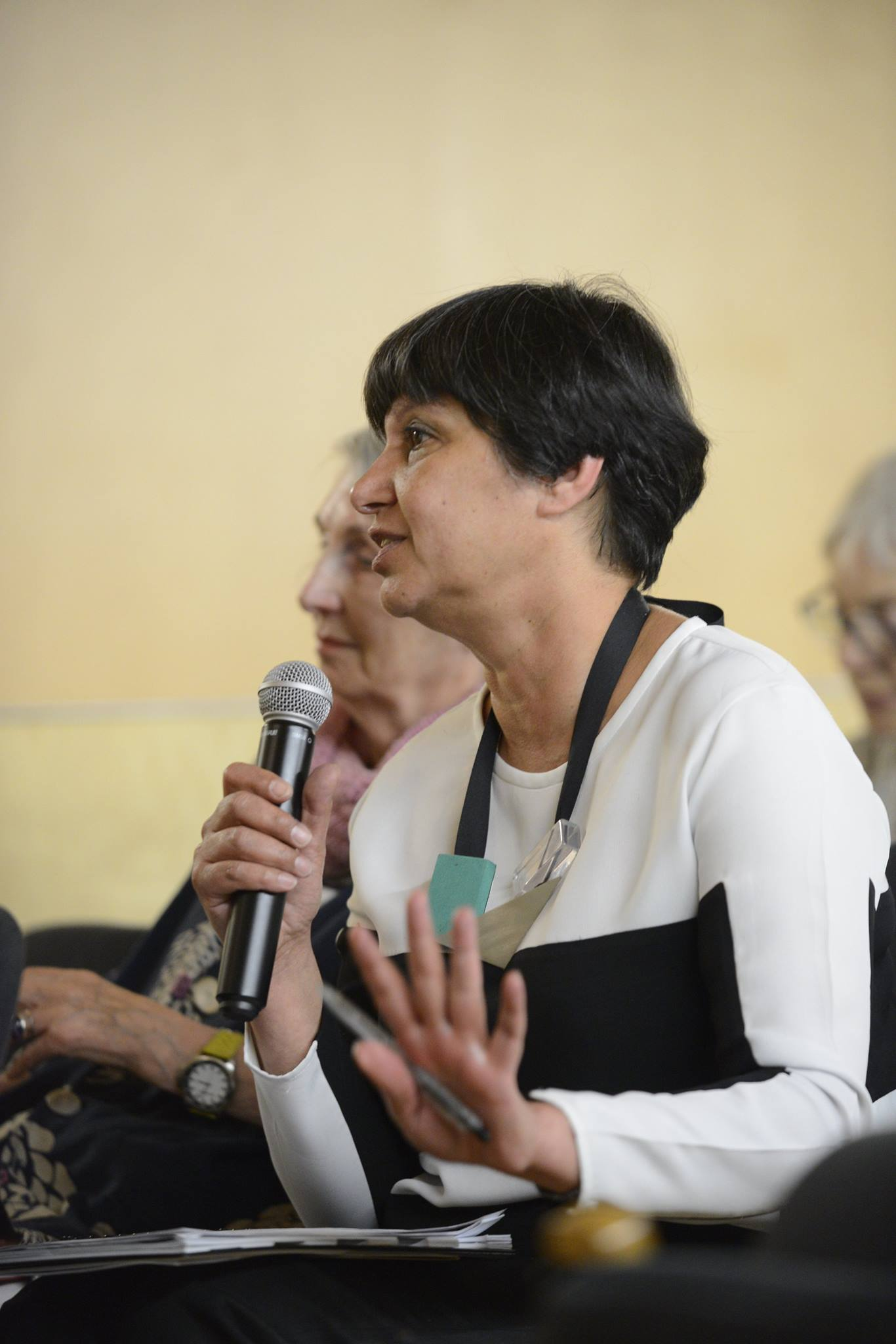
Shariff in 2016

Yasmin Shariff (born in 1956 in Uganda) is a Ugandan-born British architect, environmentalist and university professor, known for her defence of gender equality in the field of architecture.

== Biography ==
Yasmin Shariff was born to Indian parents in Uganda, East Africa, in 1956 when Uganda was still a British protectorate. She spent her childhood between Hampshire in the United Kingdom and Nairobi until finally settling in Hertfordshire in 1977. She studied and graduated in Architecture at the Bartlett School of Architecture (Faculty of the Built Environment) at University College London. Before that, Shariff had completed a master's degree in Archaeology in 1981 at the School of Oriental and African Studies, University of London.

In 1983, she married architect Dennis Sharp (1933–2010), with whom she had a son, Deen, and the family then moved to Epping, Essex.

== Career ==
In addition to working as an architect in firms such as Populous, Pringle Brandon (Perkins and Will) and Jestico & Whiles, Shariff has also been a university professor for more than a decade at the University of Westminster. She is currently a board member of the firm Dennis Sharp Architects, which she joined in 1992. She has held the position of Honorary Secretary of the Chair of AA and AA XX 100, as well as conducting education consultancy at Eric Parry Architects.

She has participated in projects such as Aspenden Lodge (2007–2009); the renovation of Norman Foster's Renault factory in Swindon (2006–2008); the Luton Community Center (2005), the Eco-Home, Bayford (2005–2009); the Strawdance Dance Studio; and the Community Environmental Project (1999). She worked on the Trinity Bridge project in Manchester (1994–95), where she worked with the architect Santiago Calatrava.
