= International Committee of Architectural Critics =

- Abbreviation: CICA
- Formation: October 26, 1978
- Type: NPO
- Purpose: architecture criticism
- Headquarters: Paris
- President: Prof Joseph Rykwert, United States
- Parent organization: International Union of Architects
- Website: www.cicarchitecture.org

The International Committee of Architectural Critics (French: Comité International des Critiques d'Architecture, Spanish: Comité Internacional de Críticos de Arquitectura - CICA) is a non-profit organization of international architecture critics, and was founded in Mexico City on October 26, 1978, during the 13th World Congress of the Union internationale des architectes (UIA). The CICA is headquartered nearby the UIA in Paris. Paris was also the residence of Pierre Vago, who was head of the organization for years. The seat of the secretary was originally located in Buenos Aires, residence of Jorge Glusberg, but can be transferred per decret to any other place worldwide according to the residence of the chairmen.

Founding members of the CICA were Pierre Vago, Bruno Zevi, Max Blumenthal, Mildred Schmertz, Blake Huges, Jorge Glusberg, Louise Noelle Gras Gas, Julius Posener and others.

== CICA awards ==
All awards of the association were originally called CICA Award. Since 2003 they have been named after the foundation members. The CICA Book Award was the first award of the CICA and was awarded at the 14th UIA World Congress in 1981.

CICA special awards were awarded to the China Architecture & Building Press (CABP) and to Springer-Verlag for the "World Architecture: A Critical Mosaic 1900-2000" series.

Selected prize winners in alphabetical order

- ARK, The Finnish Architectural Review (Finland); CICA Pierre Vago Award for Architectural Journalism 2003
- Marco Casagrande; for conceptual and artistic architecture
- Alan Colquhoun
- Roger Connah
- William Curtis
- Arthur Drexler; first winner of the CICA Award for a Preface or Introduction to an Exhibition Catalogue
- Elizabeth Farrelly
- Geoffrey Jellicoe
- James Marsden Fitch and Kenneth Frampton; first winners of the CICA Prize for Journalism
- Heinrich Klotz
- David Leatherbarrow; CICA Bruno Zevi Book Award
- Mohsen Mostafavi; CICA Bruno Zevi Book Award
- Manfredi Nicoletti; first winner of the CICA Book Award
- OASE journal (Netherlands); CICA Pierre Vago Award for Architectural Journalism 2011
- Terence Riley/Barry Bergdoll; CICA Julius Posener Award 2003 for an architectural exhibition catalogue text
- Laura P. Spinadel; "CICA Urban planning Award 2015"
