= Justus Dahinden =

Swiss architect (1925–2020)

Justus Dahinden (18 May 1925 – 11 April 2020) was a Swiss architect, teacher and writer about architecture.

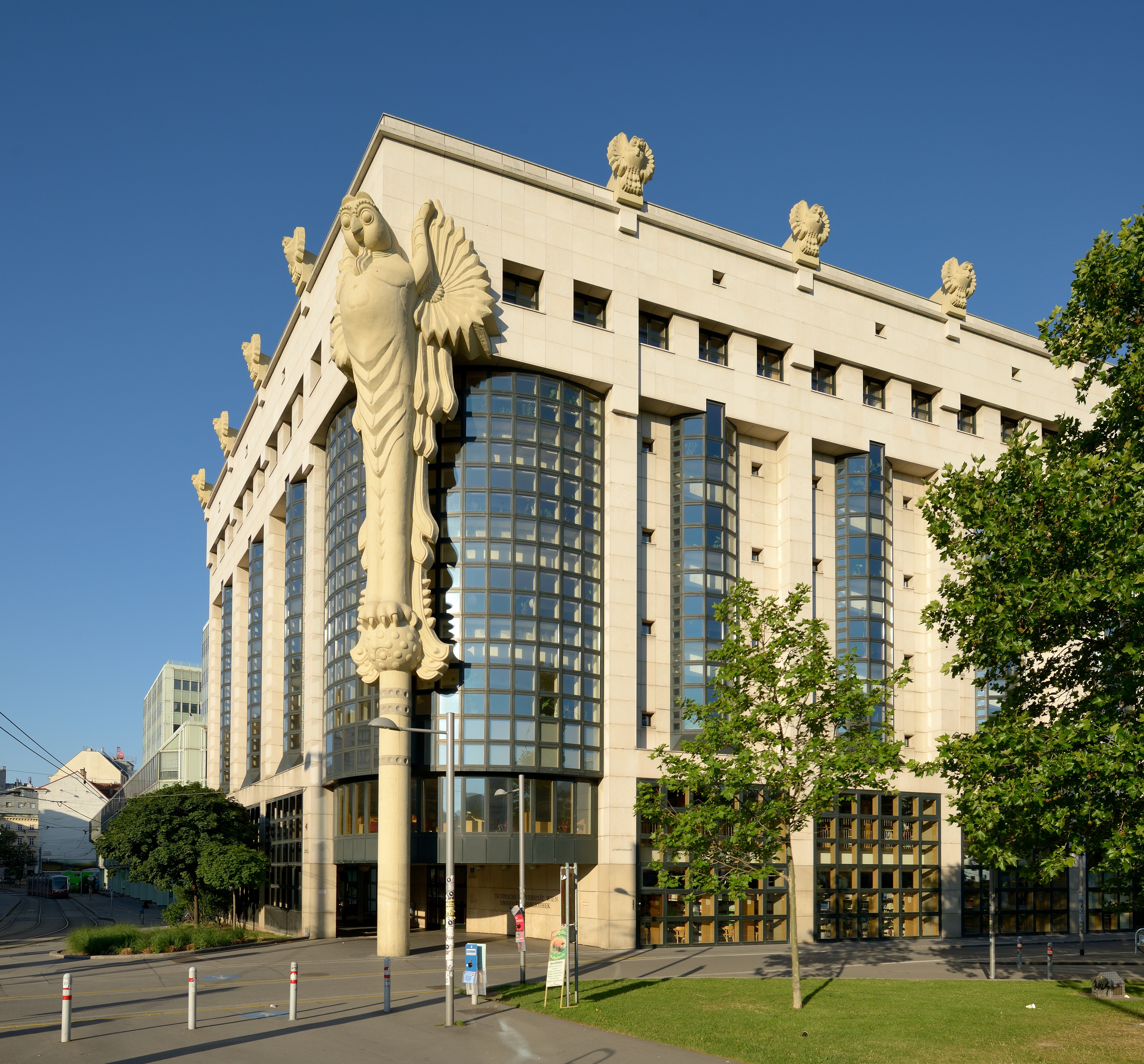
Library, Technical University Vienna (1984)

== Life ==
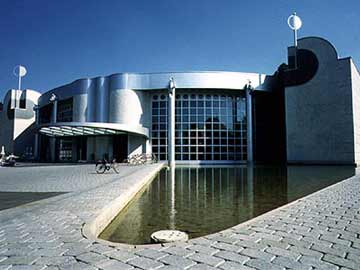
Dahinden: Migros OM Supermarket in Bern-Ostermundigen (1987)

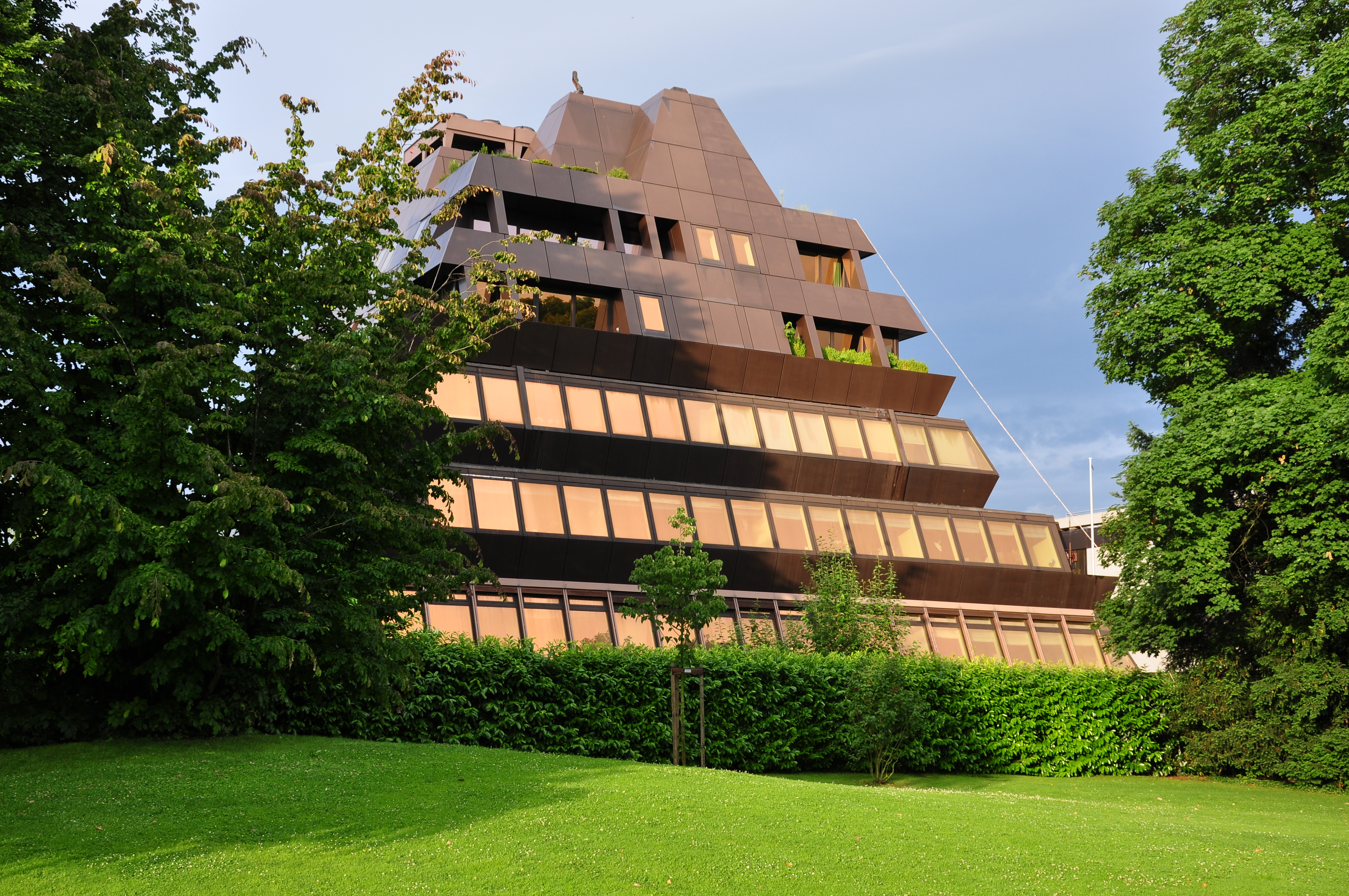
Justus Dahinden: Ferrohouse in Zurich (1970)

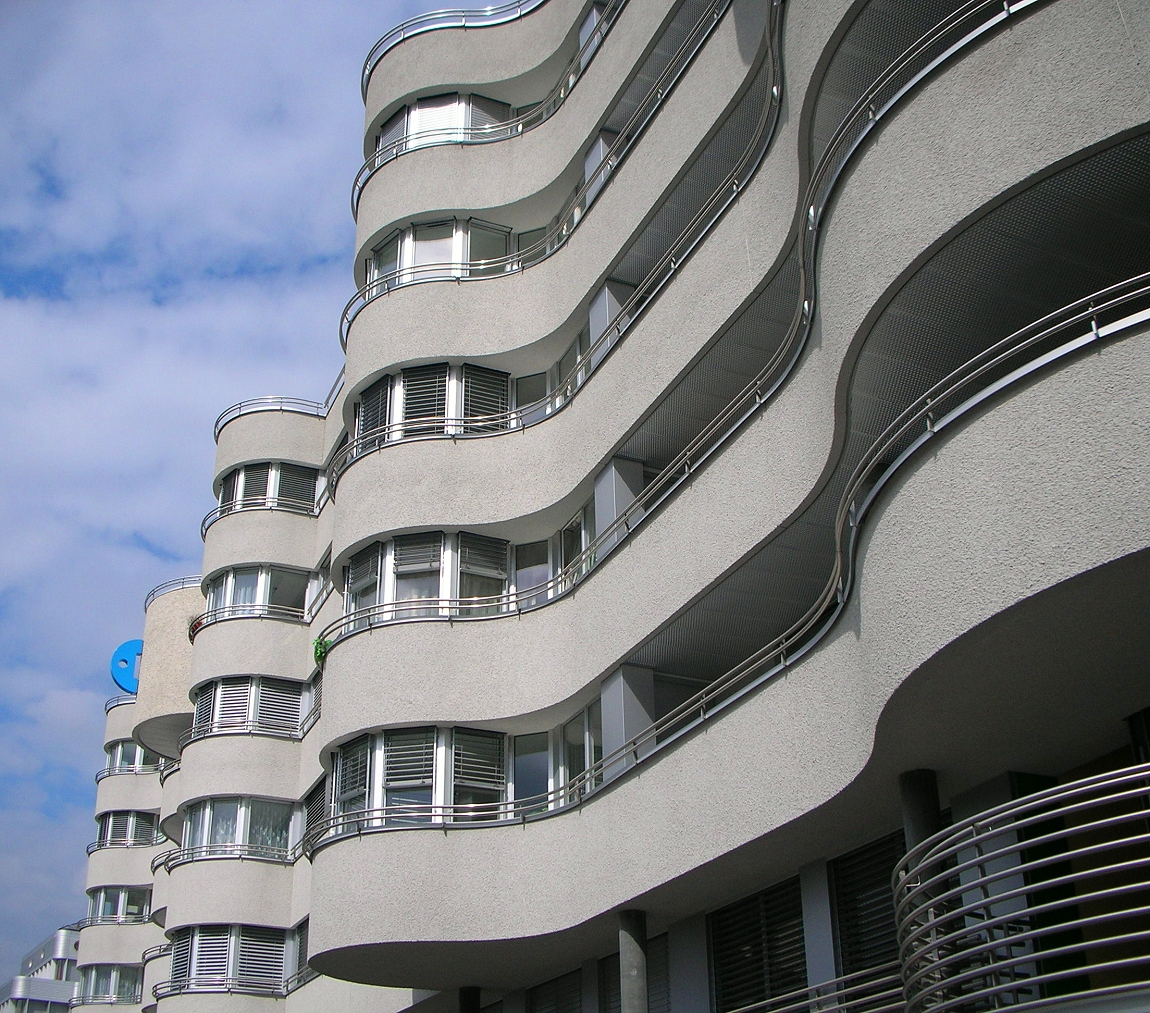
Dahinden: Binzmühle Zürich (2005)

Dahinden was born in Zürich. From 1945 to 1949, he studied architecture at ETH Zürich (ETHZ), graduating in 1956 with his PhD. In 1955 he started his own architecture office in Zürich. In 1974 Justus Dahinden became Professor of Architecture at TU Wien School of Architecture, Vienna University of Technology. He was Director of the Institute of Space and Interior Design in Vienna, from 1974 to 1995. He was appointed Life Professor at the International Academy of Architects (IAA) of Sofia in 1988, helping establish its reputation as one of the leading architecture schools.

Dahinden influenced the field of architecture with ideas which have resulted in numerous suggestions and impulses. The centre of Dahinden's philosophy of the holistic nature of architecture is that it is a service to the human being. It is equally important to man as a physical and as a mental reality. In architecture the rational fulfilling of needs has to be complemented by taking into consideration the emotional world of the human being, whose state of mind and behavior are fundamentally influenced by architectural design. To Dahinden architecture as a language is of equal importance to architecture as a function. From this he has developed a very individual theory about contextualism in architecture.

Dahinden saw architecture as creation and evolution in the "law of the three" ("Das Gesetz der Drei"), and in doing so he provides a basis for regaining quality in architecture. His architectural architecture for non-integrated leisure time is contrasted with handling architecture for integrated leisure time. This contrast results in town-planning utopias. International relevance was given by the 1984 International Conference "Man and Space" at Vienna University of Technology with Bruno Zevi, Dennis Sharp, Pierre Vago, Jorge Glusberg, Otto Kapfinger, Frei Otto, Paolo Soleri, Ernst Gisel, Ionel Schein and others.

Dahinden created buildings all over the world so as Residential, Houses, Housing, Hospitality (Holiday Villages, Hotels and Resorts and Multipurpose Buildings as well as a comprehensive portrayal of the church centres built in Europe and Africa. Planning and architectural systems developed by Dahinden himself have resulted in interesting solutions both in Europe and in the Middle East.

Dahinden received a number of international awards for his buildings and projects. The most prestigious of these is the "Grand Prix d'Architecture" which was awarded in 1981 in Paris for the holiday village Twannberg built by the Swiss Social Foundation. This prize has previously been awarded, for example, to the City of Amsterdam, to Le Corbusier and to the Government of the Punjab in India for the buildings in Chandigarh. In 2003 he was nominated from Slovakia for the Mies van der Rohe Award for European Architecture for the "Church of St. Francis Minorites" (in cooperation with -STUDIO FOR, Slovakia).

Dahinden held honorary doctorates from FAU/ Buenos Aires, Comenius University Bratislava and CAYC/ Buenos Aires.

== Awards ==
- 1981 Grand Prix d'Architecture 1981, CEA Cercle d'Ètudes Architecturales, Paris
- 1981 INTERARCH 81, World Triennial of Architecture, Sofia, Medal and Prize of the City of Nates for Habitat in Iran
- 1983 INTERARCH 83, World Triennial of Architecture, Competition HUMA 2000, Sofia, Medal and Prize of the National Committee of Peace of Bulgaria for the Project "Stadthügel" ("Urban Mound")
- 1985 INTERARCH 85, World Triennial of Architecture, Sofia, Award for competition of projects and realizations, personal work
- 1989 INTERARCH 89, World Triennial of Architecture, Sofia, Award for the Biography "Justus Dahinden-Architektur-Architecture"

== Publications ==
- 1967 "New trends in church architecture" Universe Books, New York
- 1972 "Urban Structures for the Future" Pall Mall Press, New York
- 1974 "Akro-Polis . Frei-Zeit-Stadt / Leisure City" Karl Krämer Publ. Bern/Stuttgart, ISBN 3-7828-1018-X
- 1988 "Justus Dahinden - Architektur - Architecture" Biography, Karl Krämer Publ. Stuttgart, ISBN 3-7828-1601-3
- 1991 "M... anders /autrement /different. Migros-Zentrum Ostermundigen", Karl Krämer Publ. Stuttgart, ISBN 3-7828-1608-0
- 2005 "Mensch und Raum / Men and Space", Karl Krämer Publ. Stuttgart, ISBN 3-7828-1614-5
