= International Academy of Architecture =

Non-profit organisation in Bulgaria

The International Academy of Architecture (IAA, Bulgarian: Международна архитектурна академия) is a non-governmental and non-profit organization with special status in the United Nations Economic and Social Council (UN ECOSOC), located in Sofia, Bulgaria.

The Bulgarian name is also used besides the English translation in all documents for use in Bulgaria. Working languages are English, French, Russian and Spanish. Members of the IAA are leading academicians and faculties from all over the world.
