= Víctor Grippo =

Argentine artist (1936–2002)

Victor Grippo (10 May 1936 – February 2002) was an Argentine painter, engraver and sculptor, considered the father of conceptual art in Argentina. He was born in Junín, province of Buenos Aires, the elder of two sons of an Italian immigrant father and an Argentine mother of Albanese origin.

== Life and work ==
Grippo was raised in his birth town, and in his youth he moved to the capital of the province, La Plata, and then to the city of Buenos Aires. He studied Chemistry and Pharmacy in the University of La Plata, and attended seminars by Héctor Cartier at the Fine Arts School. He had been interested in art from an early age. He started off as a painter and engraver in the 1950s, and in the 1960s he began experimenting with sculpture, and produced animated pieces (with engines and lighting).

In 1966 he held his first solo exhibition at the Lirolay gallery in Buenos Aires, presenting oils linked to geometric abstraction.

In his work he has sought a convergence between science and art. His work, one of whose main motives is the idea of transformation, has always revolved around daily life, the world of work, food and energy. From the beginning he used materials and unconventional means in his objects, sculptures and installations, to reflect on the social and spiritual conditions of the workers, of the artists. It belonged to the group of the thirteen, integrated by Jacques Bedel, Luis Fernando Benedit, Gregorio Dujovny, among others. Finally, this group becomes the CAYC Group.

Between the years of 1968 and 1970 his works led to a luminous kinetic, machines were wrapped in fabrics, subjected to the surface passage of light.

Victor Grippo researches the energy generation processes through very simple technical resources. One of the raw materials used in his work has been the potato (which he uses as a metaphor) food that was born in America, but after the conquest spread throughout Europe.

Grippo, based on its cultural symbolism, used the energy contained in potatoes, forming electric batteries and connecting them with cables to operate different devices, from a radio to a multimeter that measured the energy generated. That kind of works became a classic of the artist who was developing in different facilities around the world.

Using electrodes and measuring systems, the artist shows the latent power in plant life.

He creates facilities that are at the same time spaces of liberated energy, behind these works is also found a meaning referring to alchemy and to the efforts to transfigure the material world.

One of his most well-known works is Analogía I (1970), presented in the collective exhibition Art Systems I, at the Museum of Modern Art, and which has been presented later in different versions in different parts of the world.

In 2002 Konex Foundation from Argentina granted him the Diamond Konex Award, one of the most prestigious awards in Argentina, as the most important personality in the Visual Arts of his country in the last decade.

He made invaluable calculations for quantum physics, relating the atoms and the theories of the absorbent nebula in a totally renewing way with conceptual art, thus achieving a kind of tactile hologram.

The works of this artist no longer speak of the power that technology has to transform the lives of people, but rather of its articulation as an instrument of thought.

Grippo died in Buenos Aires in February 2002.

== Artworks ==
- 1966. Emitter-Channel-Receiver or System.
- 1967. Symbolic abstraction of a distillery (mockup).
- 1968. Cube, in collaboration with Dalmiro Sirabo and Rubén Segura.
- 1970. Elastociclo, first prize in the field of visual experiences, in the III Festival of the Arts of Tandil.
- 1971. Analogía I.
- 1972. Analogía IV, second prize in the Third Salon Artists with Acolics Paolini, in the Museum of Modern Art of Buenos Aires.
- 1972. Towards a profile of Latin American Art.
- 1972. Construction of a popular bread oven.
- 1977. Valijita de panadero, tribute to Marcel Duchamp.
- 1978. Valijita de crítico sagaz.
- 1978. The potato gilds the potato, in San Pablo.
- 1978. Table, Multiple Art Gallery of Buenos Aires.
- 1980. Valijita de albañil.

=== International collectives with the Group of 13 ===
- 1974. Art de systèmes en Amérique Latine, at the Pierre Cardin Space in Paris.
- 1974. Conceptual Art Facing the Latin American Problem, exhibited in the Museum of Sciences and Arts of the National Autonomous University of Mexico (UNAM).
- 1974. A museum model for the eighties, in Halvat Huvit Gallery in Helsinki.
- 1974. Latinoamérica 74 at the Internationaal Cultureel Centrum in Antwerp and at the Palais des Beaux-Arts in Brussels.

== Exhibitions ==
- 1966. Lirolay Gallery. Presents his geometric paintings in oil.
- 1971. Analogy I. Art Systems Exhibition.
- 1972. Analogy IV.
- 1977. Analogy I, second version. XIV São Paulo Biennial. He received the Itamaraty Award.
