= Noisy-sur-École =

- Commune
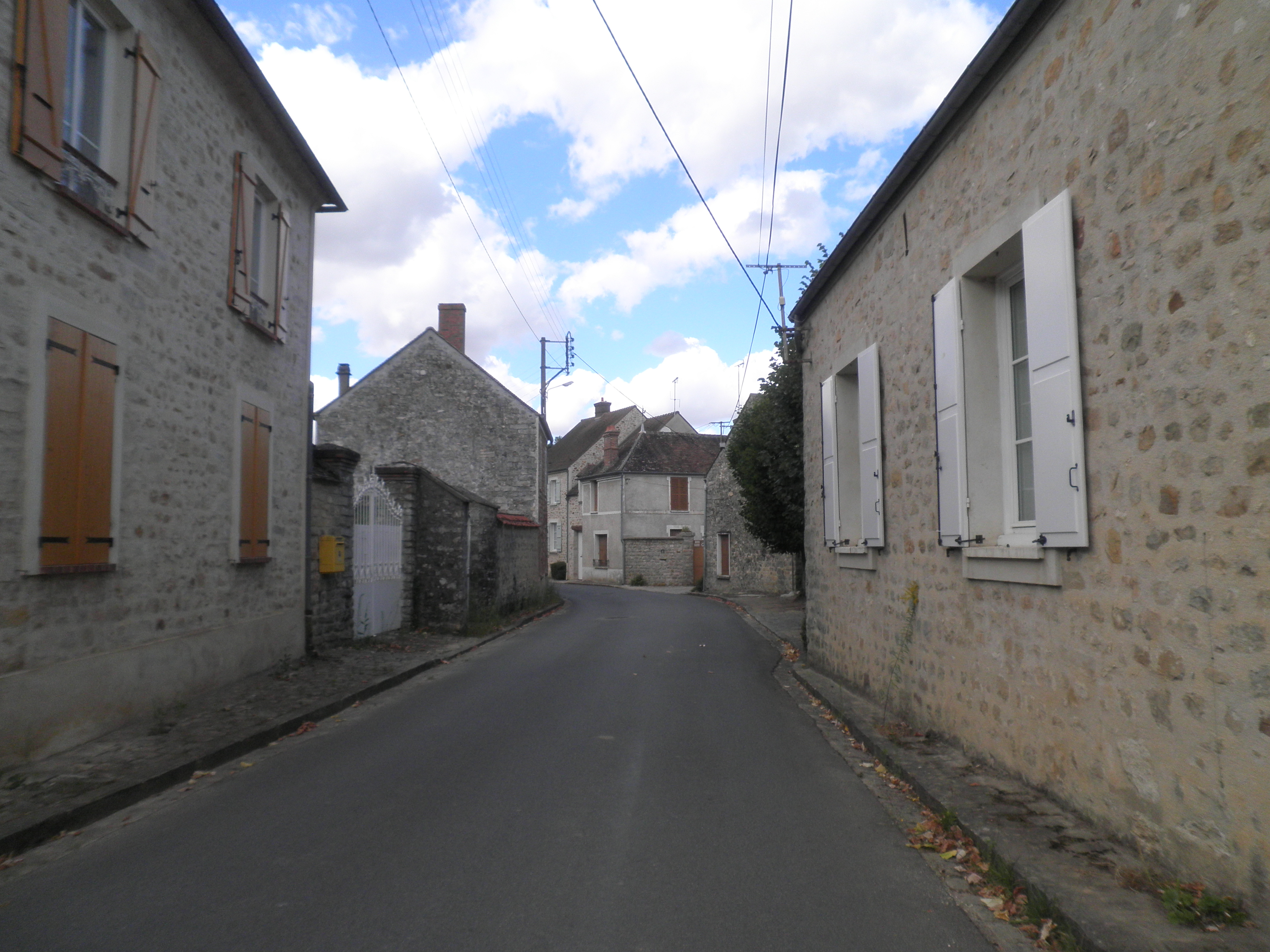
- The main road in Noisy-sur-École

- Coat of arms
- Location of Noisy-sur-École
- Location within France Location within Île-de-France (region)
- Coordinates: 48°22′06″N 2°30′30″E
- Country: France
- Region: Île-de-France
- Department: Seine-et-Marne
- Arrondissement: Fontainebleau
- Canton: Fontainebleau
- Intercommunality: CA Pays de Fontainebleau

Government
  - Mayor (2020–2026): Christian Bournery
- Area^{1}: 29.91 km^{2} (11.55 sq mi)
- Highest elevation: 127 m (417 ft)
- Lowest elevation: 63 m (207 ft)
- Population (2023): 1,797
  - Density: 60.08/km^{2} (155.6/sq mi)
- Time zone: UTC+01:00 (CET)
  - Summer (DST): UTC+02:00 (CEST)
- INSEE/Postal code: 77339 /77123
- ^{1} French Land Register data, which excludes lakes, ponds, glaciers > 1 km^{2} (0.386 sq mi or 247 acres) and river estuaries.

Noisy-sur-École (French pronunciation: [nwazi syʁ ekɔl]) is a commune in the Seine-et-Marne department in the Île-de-France region in north-central France.

== Demographics ==
Inhabitants are called Noisséens in French.

== See also ==
- Communes of the Seine-et-Marne department
