= Ionel Schein =

French architect

Ionel Schein (1927 – 30 December 2004) was a Romanian-born French architect.

Schein was a pioneer in the use of synthetic materials and created the first plastic house in 1956. On his death Le Monde described him as "one of the major figures in French architecture".
