= The School of Architecture =

Institution in Paradise Valley, Arizona, US

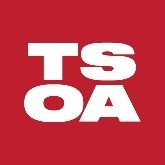
- The School of Architecture logo
- Motto: Live Architecture
- Type: Private architecture school
- Established: 1932, 94 years ago
- Accreditation: NAAB
- President: Chris Lasch
- Dean: Stephanie Lin
- Location: Scottsdale, Arizona, United States; 33°34′01.8″N 111°56′31″W
- Website: tsoa.edu

The School of Architecture (TSOA) is a private architecture school in Scottsdale, Arizona. It was founded in 1986 under the name of The Frank Lloyd Wright School of Architecture as an accredited school by surviving members of the Taliesin Fellowship. The school offers a Master of Architecture program focusing on the organic architecture design philosophy of Frank Lloyd Wright. The school is the smallest accredited graduate architecture program in the United States and emphasizes hands-on learning, architectural immersion, experimentation, and a design-build program that grew out of the Taliesin Fellowships’ tradition of building shelters in the Arizona desert. The school is not ranked by any ranking publications.

The school is located at Cattle Track Arts, a historically significant arts campus in Scottsdale, Arizona. From 2020 to 2023, it was located at the historic campuses of Cosanti in Paradise Valley and Arcosanti near Mayer, Arizona. It was initially located at Wright's estates of Taliesin West in Scottsdale and Taliesin in Spring Green, Wisconsin.

== History ==
=== Founding of the Taliesin Fellowship ===
In 1931, Frank Lloyd Wright and his wife, Olgivanna, circulated a prospectus to an international group of distinguished scholars, artists, and friends, announcing their plan to form a school at Taliesin in Spring Green where students would “Learn by Doing.” Education at Taliesin emphasized painting, sculpture, music, drama, and dance “in their places as divisions of architecture.” Each of these elements of the fine arts, as the Wrights conceived them, would lead to broader learning.

The ambitious plan for an endowed school exceeded the Wrights’ capacity to attract funds in the second full year of the Great Depression, so the school was founded as an apprenticeship program in 1932 instead. Wright also expressed his disdain for conventional architecture schools, cautioning "Beware of architectural schools except as the exponent of engineering." In 1939, Wright advised the Royal Institute of British Architects that "I do not want you to have the idea that Taliesin is a school, or a community. It happens to be our home and where we work, and these young people are my comrade apprentices: no scholars. They come to help, and if they can learn-well, we are very happy."

During the years of the Taliesin Fellowship, Wright's apprentices worked on important Wright projects including the Johnson Wax Headquarters, Fallingwater, and the Guggenheim Museum in New York. The apprenticeship program continued after the school gained formal accreditation in 1986, and the apprentices would be engaged in the design and operational activities of Taliesin Associated Architects on projects like Monona Terrace, until the Wright's legacy firm disbanded in 2003.

=== Accreditation as The Frank Lloyd Wright School of Architecture ===
The apprenticeship program, the Taliesin Fellowship, evolved into the Frank Lloyd Wright School of Architecture, which was established in response to changing licensing requirements for architects, particularly the requirement to graduate from an accredited institution prior to sitting for the Architect Registration Examination. Rather than allow the school to become obsolete, the school acquired the necessary accreditation to continue although some may question the decision to create an accredited architecture school from Wright's apprenticeship program, given his antipathy for architecture schools--"Beware of architectural schools except as the exponent of engineering." Despite this internal discord, the school pressed on, and under the leadership of Dean Tom Casey, became a fully accredited program in 1986.

In 2014, the school's accreditation was challenged by the Higher Learning Commission based on new regulations that required it to have independent budgeting and governance from its parent organization, The Frank Lloyd Wright Foundation. This was resolved by 2017, when the school separated legally from the Frank Lloyd Wright Foundation and changed its name to The School of Architecture at Taliesin. However, the school remained on its historic campuses of Taliesin and Taliesin West.

The school maintained its accreditation through 2020 following the closure announcement by establishing itself as an independent entity and moving to a new historic campus.

=== Becoming The School of Architecture ===
Despite an announcement on January 28, 2020, that the school would cease operations on both campuses and close by June 2020, the school remains open and continues to educate Master of Architecture students. According to this announcement, the school's governing board determined that "the School did not have a sustainable business model that would allow it to maintain its operation as an accredited program." This announcement followed the failure of discussions between the board and the Frank Lloyd Wright Foundation about the creation of new, non-accredited educational programs. At the time of the announcement, the school indicated they were negotiating an agreement for the 30 currently enrolled students to transfer to The Design School at ASU's Herberger Institute for Design and the Arts.

It was reported that prior to the closure announcement, the school and the foundation were in talks to develop alternative educational programming that did not require accreditation. According to the foundation, the proposals that emerged from these discussions were not approved by the school's board.

Six weeks after announcing the pending closure, the school's board of directors reversed course and announced that the school had received new funding and was financially viable. However, the agreement between the Foundation and School expired by its own terms on July 31, 2020. As of March 11, 2020, the school board expressed its intention to continue school operations and reopened admissions, despite no resolution with the Foundation being reached at that time.

In 2020, the school moved to the historic campuses of Cosanti and Arcosanti and changed its name to The School of Architecture. In 2023, the school moved to Cattle Track Arts in Scottsdale, Arizona.

== Academics ==
The school offers a three-year, project-based Master of Architecture degree, with a focus on organic architecture. The school is accredited by the National Architectural Accrediting Board and the Higher Learning Commission. The school offers a unique hand-on design build program that encourages design exploration and experimentation. It also offers courses that preserve Wright's legacy of teaching architecture holistically.

== Student life ==
Students mostly live, eat, and work onsite.

The student's body is governed by its own elected student government which is elected on an annual basis by simple majority vote. The students operate their own website, social media, and magazine, known as WASH.

== Awards ==
The school has been awarded numerous grants from the Graham Foundation for its student publications.
