= Dan Theodorescu =

American physician and academic

Dan Theodorescu, M.D., Ph.D.
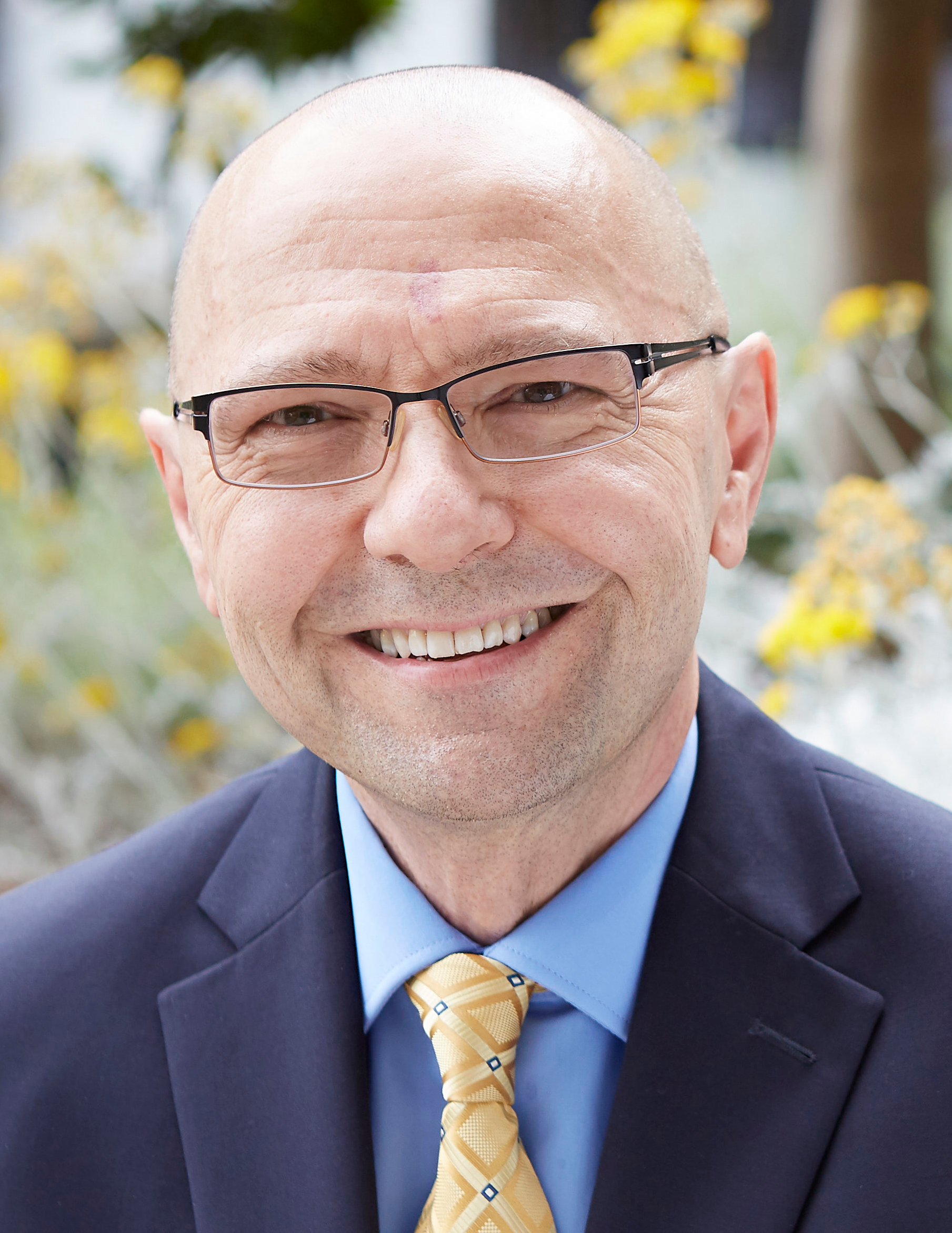
- Scientist, professor and physician in the field of oncology
- Education: Medical Degree, Queen's University at Kingston, 1986; Doctorate, University of Toronto, 1991; Residency in Urology, University of Toronto, 1994; Fellowship in Urologic Oncology, Memorial Sloan Kettering Cancer Center, 1995
- Occupation: Director of University of Arizona Cancer Center
- Website: https://cancercenter.arizona.edu/

Dan Theodorescu is an American physician and academic. He is the Director of the University of Arizona Cancer Center.

== Education ==
Theodorescu earned a medical degree from Queen's University at Kingston in 1986, followed by a doctorate from the University of Toronto in 1991. His post degree training was a residency in urology from the University of Toronto in 1994 and a fellowship in urologic oncology at Memorial Sloan Kettering Cancer Center in 1995.

== Career ==
From 2010 until 2018, Theodorescu was Director of the University of Colorado Cancer Center and a professor of Surgery-Urology. He was the Paul Mellon Chair at the University of Virginia and Paul Bunn Chair and Distinguished University Professor at the University of Colorado School of Medicine. He previously worked at Cedars-Sinai Medical Center as the Cancer Director.

Theodorescu is a member of the American Society for Clinical Investigation, Association of American Physicians, the American Association of Genitourinary Surgeons, the American Surgical Association, and the National Academy of Medicine. He is an Honorary Fellow of the American Association for the Advancement of Science. He is also a founding co-editor in chief of the journal Bladder Cancer.

=== Research ===
Theodorescu has researched molecular mechanisms driving bladder cancer, discovery of tools that determine drug response and new therapeutics. Examples of his research include examining genes that regulate tumor growth and metastasis such as RhoGDI2 and biomarkers and approaches to precision medicine. He led the work on the “first in class” RalGTPase inhibitor as a new therapeutic in cancer. He has published work showing DDR2 as a target for effective combination immunotherapy with checkpoint inhibitors and the presence of a new cellular subtype in bladder tumors, called “C3”, shown to predict response to immune checkpoint therapy.
