= Conrad Clipper =

Experimental musician

Conrad Clipper is the pseudonym of an anonymous English musician and producer. His first album, Cycle of Liminal Rites, was released as a limited edition cassette on Love Lion in 2016. It was first played on BBC Radio 3 Late Junction by Max Reinhardt, who described it as "a rare and tender sonic wonder". His second album, Heron's Book of Dreams, was recorded at Arcosanti, Arizona during FORM Festival, and in Berlin. It was mixed and mastered by Deerhoof guitarist John Dieterich, and released on vinyl by Luau Records in 2021. Norman Records described it as: "the most delicate and beautiful album that instantly transports you to a place of calm", while Narc Magazine stated: "It is both soothing and scintillating, oozing atmosphere. Creeping, seeping melodiously, one track bleeding seamlessly into the next, resulting in a mystical and magical collection."

In a 2021 interview with 15 Questions, Clipper revealed that his recording process involves arranging and programming in Logic alongside traditional instrumentation: "I use Logic and especially a tool called Scripter to run Java-based programming to create arpeggiators for piano. This is how I made my first record, Cycle of Liminal Rites. Scripter lets you make piano arpeggios that are robotic yet almost human. I spend a huge amount of time and care on the humanization of computer sounds."

== Discography ==
- Cycle of Liminal Rites (2016, Love Lion)
- Heron's Book of Dreams (2021, Luau Records)
