= Marwan Krunz =

American engineer and computer scientist

- Marwan Krunz delivering a keynote on AI in next-generation wireless systems at the University of Jordan, June 2025.
- Awards: IEEE TCCC Outstanding Service Award (2012) IEEE Fellow (2010) NSF Career Award (1998)

Academic background
- Education: University of Jordan (BS); Michigan State University (MS and PhD)

Academic work
- Main interests: Wireless Networks, Machine Learning, Cybersecurity

Marwan Krunz is an American electrical engineer and computer scientist. He is a Regents Professor in the Department of Electrical and Computer Engineering at the University of Arizona, where he holds the Edward & Maria Keonjian Endowed Chair. Krunz holds a joint appointment as a professor of computer science at the University of Arizona and is an affiliated member of the University of Arizona Cancer Center. In 2010, he was elected a Fellow of the Institute of Electrical and Electronics Engineers (IEEE).

== Education ==
Krunz received a B.S. degree in electrical engineering from the University of Jordan in 1990. He earned his M.S. (1992) and Ph.D. (1995) in electrical engineering from Michigan State University. From 1995 to 1997, he was a postdoctoral researcher at the University of Maryland Institute for Advanced Computer Studies (UMIACS).

== Career and Research ==
Krunz's early research focused on resource allocation for transmitting multimedia traffic over packet networks, including modeling packetized variable-bit-rate video and quality of service (QoS) routing. As wireless technologies expanded, his work shifted to the design of power-controlled channel access protocols for mobile ad hoc networks (MANETs) and resource allocation schemes for MIMO-based wireless systems.

In the area of cognitive radio and dynamic spectrum access, Krunz proposed schemes for channel assignment, spectrum management, and the coexistence of heterogeneous wireless systems (such as Wi-Fi and LTE-U) over shared bands. He has also researched physical-layer (PHY) security. To complement standard cryptographic methods, he developed obfuscation techniques, including Friendly CryptoJam (FCJ), which randomizes the locations of modulated symbols to hide transmission signatures from eavesdroppers. Additionally, he studied methods to detect and mitigate insider attacks on multi-channel wireless systems, such as control-channel denial-of-service attacks and selective packet dropping.

His recent research incorporates artificial intelligence and machine learning into wireless networks. This includes the application of deep reinforcement learning for beam management in 5G millimeter-wave systems, the use of Generative AI to synthesize RF coverage maps, and self-supervised federated learning for edge computing intelligence.

Krunz has directed several NSF Industry-University Cooperative Research Centers (IUCRC). He directed the University of Arizona site of Connection One, and later co-founded and directed the Broadband Wireless Access and Applications Center (BWAC). He is currently the site director and deputy director of WISPER, an NSF center focused on next-generation (NextG) wireless systems.

From 2017 to 2020, Krunz served as the Editor-in-Chief of the peer-reviewed scientific journal IEEE Transactions on Mobile Computing. He has also served on the editorial boards for IEEE Transactions on Cognitive Communications and Networking and IEEE/ACM Transactions on Networking.

== Awards and Honors ==
- Fellow, Institute of Electrical and Electronics Engineers (2010)
- Distinguished Alumni Award, Michigan State University Department of Computer Science and Engineering (2020)
- Edward & Maria Keonjian Endowed Chair, University of Arizona (2025–present)
- IEEE Communications Society Distinguished Lecturer (2013, 2014)
- NSF CAREER Award (1998)
