= Arizona Cancer Center Chapel =

- Soleri Chapel
- Interactive map of the Arizona Cancer Center Chapel area

General information
- Architectural style: Arcology
- Location: Tucson, Pima County, Arizona, United States, 1515 N. Campbell Ave, Tucson, Arizona 85724
- Coordinates: 32.2414059°N 110.9449310°E
- Elevation: 717 ft (218 m)
- Construction started: 1985
- Completed: 1986
- Client: University of Arizona, Arizona Cancer Center
- Owner: State of Arizona
- Landlord: University of Arizona

Height
- Height: 13.5 feet (4.1 m)

Technical details
- Structural system: Silt sand-cast concrete barrel vault
- Floor area: approx. 312 square feet (29.0 m^{2})

Design and construction
- Architect: Paolo Soleri
- Structural engineer: F2DKM Architects & Engineers

The Arizona Cancer Center Chapel (also known as the Soleri Chapel) is an architectural landmark located in the University of Arizona Cancer Center, at 1515 North Campbell Avenue in Tucson, Arizona. It was designed by Italian American architect Paolo Soleri.

== History ==
Completed in 1986, the chapel was constructed in commemoration of Soleri’s wife, Colly Soleri, who died of cancer. The chapel was commissioned by the University of Arizona in the 1980s, and has been associated with the University’s Cancer Center since its completion in 1986. That same year, the chapel’s design was featured in the traveling exhibition The Architectural Visions of Paolo Soleri, organized by the Corcoran Gallery of Art.

== Design ==
The chapel's design is characterized by sand-cast barrel-vaulted concrete ceilings with embedded botanical graphics and reflects the natural environment. The chapel consists of 10 ceiling panels, a wall sculpture, decorative bells, and a stained glass window.

== Preservation efforts ==
When the Arizona Cancer Center expanded, the patient area, where the chapel is located, was reorganized into research spaces and offices. This change effectively closed the chapel to the public. It was later opened to the public as part of Tucson Modernism Week in 2013. The chapel was featured in the 2017 book Holy Modern and was named "Modern Architectural Classic" by the Tucson Historic Preservation Foundation in 2018.

=== Demolition attempt ===
In October 2023, the Tucson Historic Preservation Foundation, learning of the University of Arizona's plans to demolish the chapel, harvested and relocated artistic elements to decorate a new "meditation hallway" in the Andrew Weil Center for Integrative Medicine. The plan was led by the University of Arizona Planning Department and the architecture firm Line and Space. The plan included sending the right side of the barrel-vault to the Cosanti Foundation and installing the remnant pieces in a concrete block hallway.

Advocates, including Jim McPherson with the Arizona Preservation Foundation, Demion Clinco with Tucson Historic Preservation Foundation, and elected leaders, including Pima County Supervisor Matt Heinz, and Arizona State Representatives Christopher Mathis and Betty Villegas, appealed to University of Arizona president Robert C. Robbins to pursue an alternative approach that would prevent the destruction of the chapel. In December 2023, the University of Arizona Planning Department announced its intent to proceed with the destruction of the space.

In December 2023, the chapel was added to Arizona's Most Endangered Places list by the Arizona Preservation Foundation. The Tucson-Pima County Historical Commission unanimously passed a resolution asking for the preservation of the chapel, emphasizing the importance of adhering to Arizona Revised Statute 41-864, and underscoring the responsibility of entities like the University of Arizona in preserving historical and cultural resources.

In January 2024, the University of Arizona put the plans to demolish the chapel on "indefinite pause." During the January 2024 Pima County Board of Supervisors Meeting, Matt Heinz proposed a resolution admonishing the university's decision to ignore the Arizona State Historic Preservation Act.

As of January 2024, the chapel is still at the same location, although it remains closed to the public.
