= Paolo Soleri =

American architect (1919–2013)

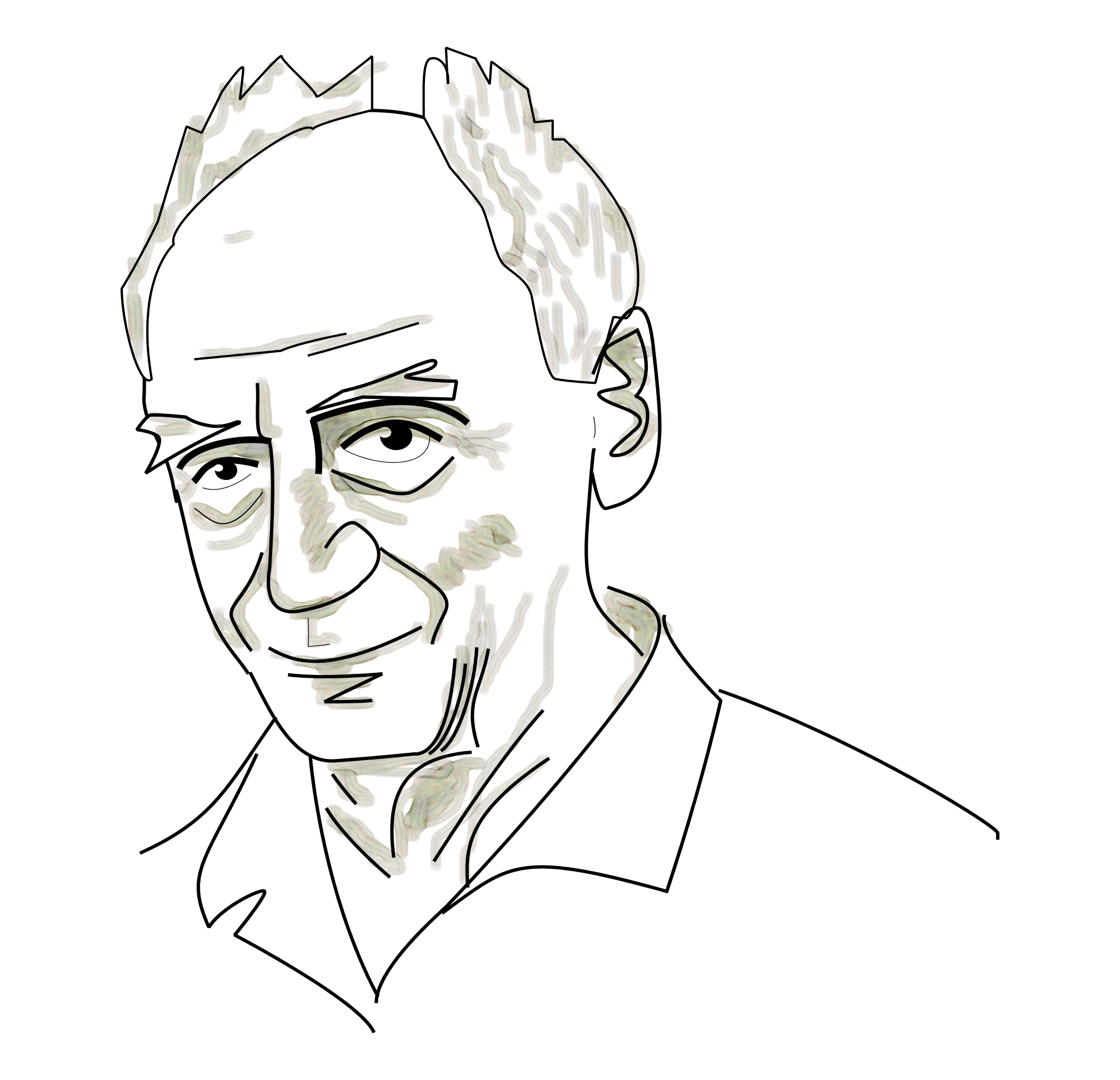
- Born: 21 June 1919; Turin, Kingdom of Italy
- Died: 9 April 2013 (aged 93); Paradise Valley, Arizona, U.S.
- Education: Polytechnic University of Turin
- Occupation: Architect
- Years active: 1944–2012
- Awards: 1963 – American Institute of Architects Gold Medal for Craftmanship; 2000 – Leone d'oro at the Venice Biennale of Architecture
- Buildings: Cosanti
- Projects: Arcosanti

Paolo Soleri (21 June 1919 – 9 April 2013) was an Italian architect and urban planner. He established the educational Cosanti Foundation and Arcosanti. Soleri was a lecturer in the College of Architecture at Arizona State University and a National Design Award recipient in 2006. He coined the concept of 'arcology' – a synthesis of architecture and ecology as the philosophy of democratic society. He died at home of natural causes on 9 April 2013 at the age of 93.

Soleri authored several books, including The Bridge Between Matter & Spirit is Matter Becoming Spirit and Arcology – City In the Image of Man.

== Early life and education ==
Soleri was born in Turin, Italy. He was awarded his "laurea" (master's degree) in architecture from the Politecnico di Torino in 1946. He visited the United States in December 1946 and spent a year and a half in fellowship with Frank Lloyd Wright at Taliesin West in Arizona, and at Taliesin in Spring Green, Wisconsin. During this time, he gained international recognition for a bridge design that was displayed at the Museum of Modern Art.

In 1950, Soleri, with his wife Colly (née Corolyn Woods), returned to Italy where he was commissioned to build a large ceramics factory, Ceramica Artistica Solimene, in Vietri on the Amalfi coast.

Soleri adapted ceramics industry processes learned at this time to use in his award-winning designs and production of ceramic and bronze windbells and silt-cast architectural structures. For more than 40 years, proceeds from sales of the wind-bells have been an important source of funds for construction that is meant to test his theoretical work. Ceramic and bronze bells continue to be produced and sold at Arcosanti and Cosanti in Arizona.

In 1956, Soleri settled in Scottsdale, Arizona, with Colly and the elder of their two daughters, the younger was born in Arizona. He began building Arcosanti in 1970 with the help of architecture and design students, as a place to test his urban design hypotheses. This "urban laboratory", so-dubbed by Ada Louise Huxtable who at the time was the architecture critic of The New York Times, became internationally renowned. In 1976 Arcosanti was featured by Newsweek magazine as "the most important urban experiment undertaken in our time".

Paolo and Colly Soleri made a lifelong commitment to research and experimentation in urban planning. They established the Cosanti Foundation, a not-for-profit 501(c)(3) educational non-profit foundation. Soleri's philosophy and works were strongly influenced by the Jesuit paleontologist and philosopher Pierre Teilhard de Chardin.

== Career ==
The International Architecture Symposium "Mensch und Raum" (Man and Space) at the Vienna University of Technology in 1984 received international attention. Paolo Soleri participated with, among others: Justus Dahinden, Dennis Sharp, Bruno Zevi, Jorge Glusberg, Otto Kapfinger, Frei Otto, Pierre Vago, Ernst Gisel, and Ionel Schein.

Soleri was a lecturer in the College of Architecture at Arizona State University and a member of the Lindisfarne Association.

In 1966, Paolo Soleri began working on the design for the Paolo Soleri Amphitheater in Santa Fe, New Mexico. It was built for the IAIA (Institute of American Indian Arts) on what is now the campus of the Santa Fe Indian School using large silt cast forms. The property is owned by the nineteen Native American Pueblos of New Mexico and is therefore not protected by local or state preservation laws.

A landmark exhibition, "City in the Image of Man – The Architectural Visions of Paolo Soleri", organized in 1970 by the Corcoran Gallery of Art in Washington, DC, traveled extensively thereafter in the U.S. and Canada, breaking records for attendance. "Two Suns Arcology, A Concept for Future Cities" opened in 1976 at the Xerox Square Center in Rochester, New York. In 1989, "Paolo Soleri Habitats: Ecologic Minutiae", an exhibition of arcologies, space habitats, and bridges, was presented at the New York Academy of Sciences. More recently, "Soleri's Cities, Architecture for the Planet Earth and Beyond" was featured at the Scottsdale Center for the Arts in Scottsdale, AZ. A Soleri bell appears in the film What the *Bleep* Do We Know? His work has been exhibited worldwide.

In 1976, Paolo Soleri was a key participant at UN Habitat I, the first UN forum on human settlements, held it Vancouver, British Columbia, Canada, North America. Soleri appeared there together with Buckminster Fuller.

In 1983 Soleri published the book Arcosanti: an urban laboratory?. In 1986, four years after the death of his wife from cancer, Soleri was commissioned to design the Arizona Cancer Center Chapel at the University of Arizona. The highly personal architectural expression featured a sand-cast barrel vault ceiling with botanical motifs, sculptural elements and a bell system.

On 10 December 2010, the Soleri Bridge and Plaza was completed. The structure had been commissioned by Scottsdale Public Art. The 130-foot (40 m) pedestrian bridge based on Paolo Soleri's design is located on the South Bank of the Arizona Canal and connects a developed retail area of the Scottsdale Waterfront with Old Town Scottsdale. The bridge is incorporated into a 22,000 sq ft (2,000 m^{2}) plaza including silt cast artwork, as well as a large bell assembly called The Goldwater Bell, also designed by Paolo Soleri.

The feature-length documentary film The Vision Of Paolo Soleri: Prophet In The Desert (2013) contains interviews with Morley Safer, Paul Goldberger, Catherine Hardwicke, Will Bruder, Jean-Michel Cousteau, Steven Holl, and Eric Lloyd Wright.

== Arcosanti ==
The Cosanti Foundation's major project is Arcosanti. Arcosanti, as originally designed by Soleri, was intended for 5,000 people; it has been in construction since 1970. Located near Cordes Junction, about 70 miles (110 km) north of Phoenix and visible from Interstate I-17 in central Arizona, the intention of the project is to provide a model that can demonstrate Soleri's concept of "Arcology", architecture coherent with ecology. Arcology was envisioned by Soleri as a hyper-dense city, designed to: maximize human interaction with ready access to shared, cost-effective infrastructural services; conserve water and reduce sewage; minimize the use of energy, raw materials and land; reduce waste and environmental pollution; increase interaction with the surrounding natural environment. In 2010, construction was underway to complete Arcosanti's Greenhouse Apron, but that initiative was put on hold not long after Soleri's death in 2013.

Arcosanti is intended as a prototype of a desert arcology. Soleri's other arcology designs envisioned sites such as the ocean (Nova Noah), et al. (see: Arcology: City in the Image of Man). Since 1970, over 7000 people have participated in Arcosanti's construction. Their international affiliation group is called the Arcosanti Alumni Network.

== Sexual abuse allegation ==
In October 2010, Daniela Soleri – Paolo Soleri's daughter – resigned from the Cosanti Foundation board, citing abuse by her father. She stated that some of Soleri's inner circle had been told decades earlier, but nothing had been done about it at the time. After the resignation, Soleri stepped down as chairman, but the board made no public statement on the reasons.

After the Scottsdale Museum of Contemporary Art had a major retrospective exhibition on Paolo Soleri in October 2017, Daniela published an article on the website Medium on 13 November 2017 accusing her father of persistent sexual abuse, writing:

In my early adolescence, my father, an architect and craftsman, began sexually molesting me, eventually attempting rape when I was 17.

Encouraged to publish the article by the #MeToo movement, Daniela wrote that she had already come forward to many of her father's colleagues but received little response:

I finally told some of Soleri's inner circle about my experiences about 24 years ago, others learned of them six years ago when I tendered my letter of resignation from the board of Soleri's Cosanti Foundation, with an explanation of why. In response to receiving my letter, one of my father's long time colleagues and board member wrote "I am disappointed in everyone." A strange reaction from a man I had known since I was seven. Two years later he presided at a memorial seminar eulogizing Soleri and his work. His message seemed to be that, yes, he's disappointed that those things occurred, but he's equally disappointed that they are being brought up, instead of silenced.

In the article, Daniela wrote about her lingering admiration for some of Soleri's work and ideas. However, she also warned against uncritical praise of artists with abusive tendencies and the tendency to "accept abusive behavior as a necessary and justified cost for the contributions of intellect or creativity". Of her father, Daniela wrote:

Soleri has been dead for nearly five years. The swell of hagiographic films, essays and performances has slowed, hopefully making room for a more useful perspective that includes not only consideration of his work, but also honest acknowledgment that he was flawed. That work will have to stand on its own, and not be seen as an inseparable part of Soleri as a person, including his best and worst behaviors.

As noted in Dezeen, Daniela's article suggested that she had approached The New York Times or other news publishers to discuss her father's abuse, but had been turned away. The Cosanti Foundation Board released an official statement in response to Daniela Soleri's:

We are saddened by Daniela Soleri's trauma. Her decision to speak out about her father's behavior towards her helps us confront Paolo Soleri's flaws, and compels us to reconsider his legacy. With Paolo Soleri's creative intelligence, he understood the need for discipline and limits to the urban form. However, his narcissism prevented him from understanding the need for discipline and limits on abusive behavior. We support and stand firmly with Daniela. We know that Arcosanti and Cosanti are much greater than the ideas of one man. Over the past fifty years, more than 8,000 participants from all over the world have contributed to Arcosanti and Cosanti through our workshops and programs. Our work in urban planning will continue. It was considered radical fifty years ago and has proven itself relevant today. Our goal is a built environment inspired by Soleri's architecture that fosters community, integrates the natural world, and nurtures the best of human nature.

Curbed editor-in-chief Kelsey Keith wrote "[Daniela] Soleri's account is breathtaking not only for its thorough and very personal reckoning with the truth, but for its clear-eyed articulation of the reasons why assigning all intellectual power to a solitary genius is so harmful." Keith noted that architecture as a profession "hasn't (yet) experienced its Weinstein moment", referring to the Harvey Weinstein sexual abuse allegations and the resulting "Weinstein effect" of reporting sexual misconduct committed by powerful men in media and other industries. In a 2018 Curbed article, Hilary George-Parkin said:

While Hollywood, tech, sports, media, politics, the restaurant industry, and others are reeling from high-profile revelations and resignations, the design world has remained—with the notable exception of Daniela Soleri's account of sexual abuse by her father, architect Paolo Soleri—mostly undisturbed in the public realm.

== Death ==
Soleri died on 9 April 2013 and was buried at Arcosanti in its private cemetery, beside his wife.

== Major projects ==
- Dome House, 1949 - 1950, 7199 E. Grapevine Road, Cave Creek, Arizona, listed on the National Register of Historic Places, PRIVATE HOME
- Ceramica Artistica Solimene (Solimene Ceramic Factory), 1955, Vietri sul Mare, Italy
- Cosanti, 1956 - 2013, 6433 E Doubletree Ranch Rd, Paradise Valley, Arizona, listed on the Arizona Register of Historic Places
- Paolo Soleri Amphitheater, 1970, 1501 Cerrillos Rd, Santa Fe, New Mexico
- Arcosanti, 1970 - 2013, 13555 S Cross L Road, Mayer, Arizona
- Arizona Cancer Center Chapel, 1986, Univierty of Arizona Medical Campus, Tucson, Arizona
- Glendale Community College Amphitheater, 1995, 6000 W Olive Ave, Glendale, Arizona
- Soleri Bridge and Plaza, 2010, 4420 N Scottsdale Rd, Scottsdale, AZ 85251
- DeConcini House, 1982, 5107 North 21st Street, Phoenix, Arizona, PRIVATE HOME

== Bell and art projects ==
- Bell System Mobile, Sanctuary Camelback Mountain Resort, 5700 E McDonald Dr, Paradise Valley, Arizona
- Il Donnone, Phoenix Art Museum, 1625 N Central Ave, Phoenix, Arizona
- Bell System Mobile, The Mayo Clinic, 13737 N. 92nd St., Scottsdale, Arizona
- Bell System Mobile, Phoenix Public Library - Burton Barr Central Branch, 1221 N Central Ave, Phoenix, Arizona
- Bell System Mobile, Sky Harbor Airport - International Terminal, 3400 E Sky Harbor Blvd, Phoenix, Arizona
- Bell System Mobile, Neiman Marcus Department Store, 6900 E Camelback Rd Scottsdale, Arizona

== Awards ==
Soleri received fellowships from the Graham Foundation and from the Guggenheim Foundation (1964, Architecture, Planning, & Design). He was awarded three honorary doctorates and several awards from design groups worldwide:

- 1963 – American Institute of Architects Gold Medal for Craftmanship
- 1981 – Gold Medal at the World Bienniale of Architecture held by the International Academy of Architecture in Sofia, Bulgaria
- 1984 – Silver Medal of the Academie d' Architecture in Paris
- 1996 – Honorary Fellow, Royal Institute of British Architects
- 2000 – Leone d'oro at the Venice Biennale of Architecture for his lifelong achievement
- 2006 – Cooper Hewitt National Design Award for lifetime achievement

== Legacy ==
Paolo Soleri's architectural and philosophical contributions have left a lasting impact on the fields of architecture, urban planning, and environmental design. His legacy can be observed through various aspects:

=== Arcosanti and urban laboratory concepts ===
Soleri's experimental urban laboratory, Arcosanti, serves as a testament to his commitment to the concept of arcology — the fusion of architecture and ecology. The ongoing development of Arcosanti since its inception in 1970 underscores Soleri's vision of creating compact, sustainable communities.

=== Ecological consciousness ===
Soleri's work reflects a deep ecological consciousness, emphasizing the need for harmonious coexistence between human settlements and the natural environment. His theoretical framework proposed efficient land use, resource conservation, and a reconsideration of societal norms in favor of ecological balance.

=== Influence on contemporary architects and urban planners ===
Many contemporary architects and urban planners acknowledge Soleri's influence on their work. His innovative ideas have inspired a generation of designers to explore sustainable and efficient urban solutions, contributing to the ongoing discourse on environmentally conscious architecture.

=== Philosophical contributions ===
Soleri's writings, including his seminal work "Arcology===: The City in the Image of Man," continue to be referenced in discussions about the future of urban living and the relationship between architecture and society. His philosophical contributions to the understanding of human settlement patterns have sparked interdisciplinary dialogues and debates.

=== Recognition and awards ===
Soleri's impact is further evident in the numerous awards and honors he received during his lifetime, including the American Institute of Architects Gold Medal (2010) for his enduring commitment to blending architecture with ecology.

The Paolo Soleri Archives, the collection of Soleri's drawings and writings, is located at Arcosanti. The Soleri Archives is managed by Sue Kirsch. This collection is shared through exhibits, publication and is made available to scholars and historians.

While Paolo Soleri's arcological vision has faced both praise and criticism, his legacy persists as a source of inspiration for those seeking innovative and sustainable solutions to the challenges of urbanization and environmental stewardship.

A number of films and recorded interviews have focused on Soleri's life and architectural contributions including: Paolo Soleri: Ideas and Work (1972), Soleri's Cities: Architecture for Planet Earth and Beyond Reviews (1993), Paolo Soleri: Beyond Form (2013), The Vision of Paolo Soleri: Prophet in the Desert (2013), and Paolo Soleri: Citizen of the Planet (2016). An interview with Soleri was featured in the environmental documentary The 11th Hour (2007).

== Exhibitions ==
- Documenta; the Paolo Soleri retrospective, Corcoran Gallery of Art, 1970
- Paolo Soleri: Mesa City to Arcosanti, Scottsdale Museum of Contemporary Art, 2013
- Permeant Loan, Metropolitan Museum of Art, New York
- Conceptions of Space: Recent Acquisitions in Contemporary Architecture, 2014, Museum of Modern Art, New York
- In Situ: Architecture and Landscape, 2010, Museum of Modern Art, New York
- Wunderkammer: A Century of Curiosities, 2008, Museum of Modern Art, New York
- Built in USA: Post-War Architecture, 1953, Museum of Modern Art, New York
- The Architectural Vision of Paolo Soleri 1966-1971, Museum of Contemporary Art, Chicago, Ill.
- Northern Arizona Univierty Museum, Paolo Soleri Retrospective, 2013, Flagstaf Arizona,

== Museum collections ==
- Museum of Modern Art, New York
- Metropolitan Museum of Art, New York
- Arizona State Univierty, Design and the Arts Special Collections, Phoenix, Arizona
- Hirshhorn Museum and Sculpture Garden, Washington, DC
- Cosanti Foundation
- Arcosanti Archives

== Major publications ==
- Soleri, Paolo, Documenta: Paolo Soleri is the Only Architect
- Soleri, Paolo, The Sketchbooks of Paolo Soleri, 1971
- Soleri, Paolo, The Bridge between Matter Spirit Is Matter Becoming Spirit: The Arcology of Paolo Soleri, 1973
- Soleri, Paolo, Envisioned Cities of the 21st Century, 1980
- Soleri, Paolo, The Omega Seed: An eschatological hypothesis, 1981
- Soleri, Paolo, Arcosanti: An Urban Laboratory?, 1984
- Soleri, Paolo, Paolo Soleris Earth Casting For Sculpture, Models and Construction, 1984
- Soleri, Paolo, Technology and Cosmogenesis, 1985
- Soleri, Paolo, Itinerario di architettura. Antologia degli scritti, 2003
- Soleri, Paolo; Strohmeier, John, The Urban Ideal: Conversations with Paolo Soleri
- Soleri, Paolo, Life Time Furniture Cloister Styles
- Soleri, Paolo, What if? Quaderno 1 - Quaderno 9, Ecominutiae.
- Soleri, Paolo, Arcologie. La ville à l'image de l'homme
- Soleri, Paolo, Arcology: The City in the Image of Man, 2006
- Paolo Soleri; Alvar Aalto; Louis I Kahn; Le Corbusier, 1964
- International Dialogue of Experimental Architecture. IDEA, 1966
- Wilcoxen, Ralph, Paolo Soleri: a Bibliography, 1969
- Fragments: A Selection from the Sketchbooks of Paolo Soleri : The Tiger Paradigm-Paradox, 1981
- Le architetture di Paolo Soleri. Un viaggio in Arizona
- Carter, Claire C., Repositioning Paolo Soleri: The City Is Nature, 2019
- Gianluca Frediani, Paolo Soleri e Vietri
- Soleri, Paolo; Davis, Scott M. Paolo Soleri's Earth Casting for Sculpture, Models and Construction
- Antoinette iolanda lima, Soleri architecture as human ecology, 2000
- Soleri, Paolo, Visionary Cities: The Arcology of Paolo Soleri

== See also ==
- Buckminster Fuller
- Jacque Fresco
