= Arcosanti =

Experimental town in Yavapai County, Arizona

Coordinates: 34°20′33″N 112°06′02″W

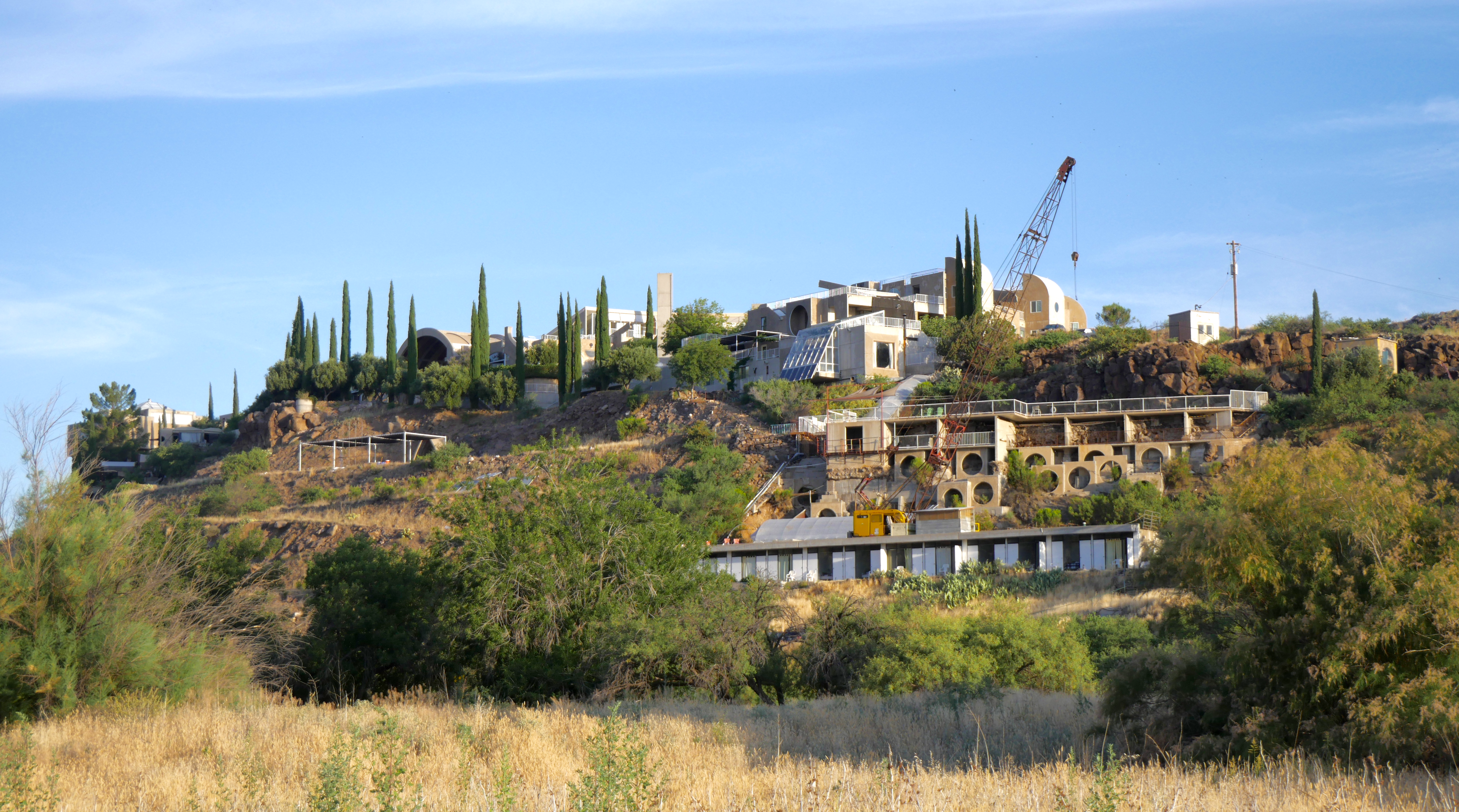
View of Arcosanti from the southeast, showing buildings from Crafts III on the far left to the guestrooms in the right foreground

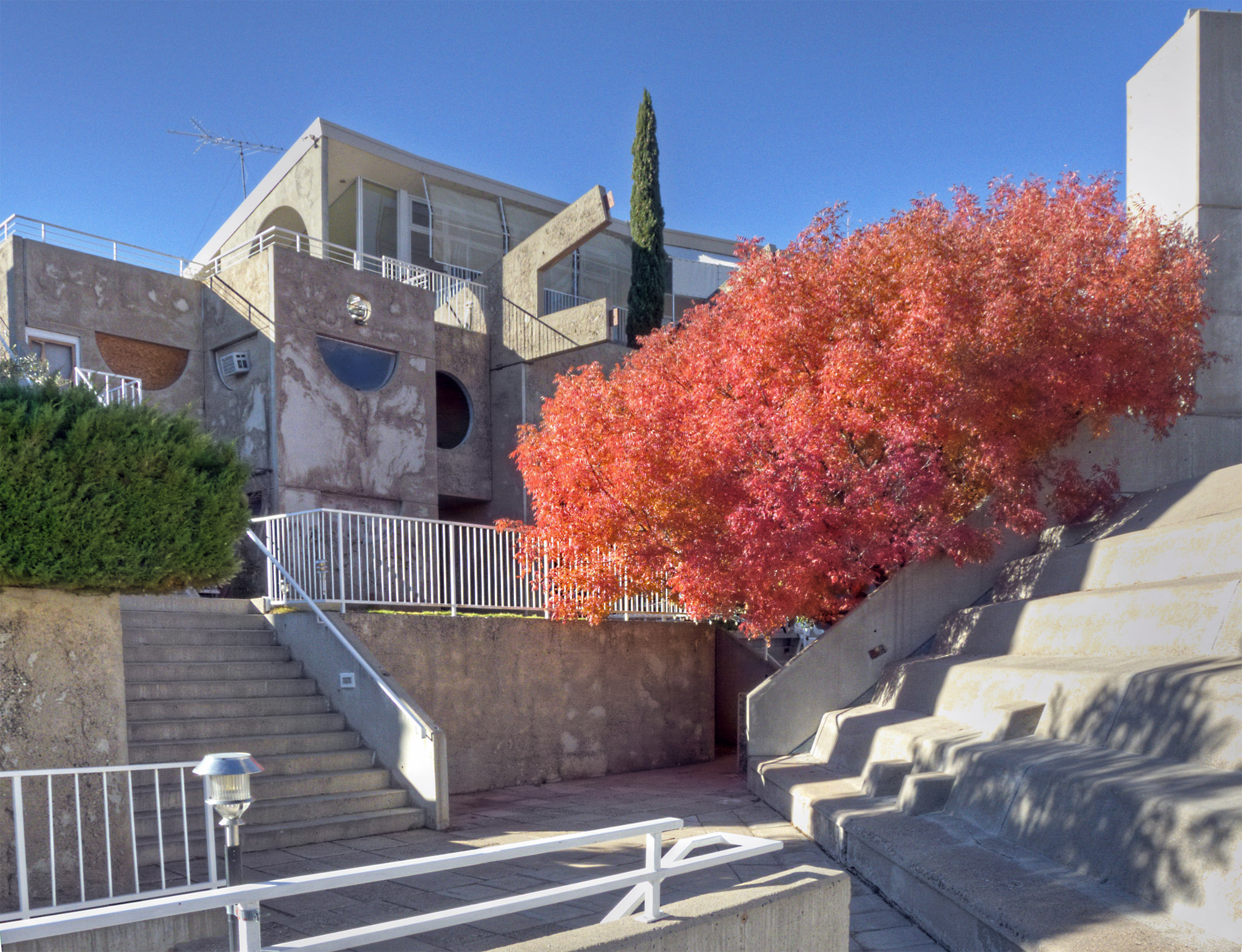
Part of the complex with fall foliage

Arcosanti is a projected experimental town with a molten bronze bell casting business in Yavapai County, central Arizona, United States, 70 mi (110 km) north of Phoenix, at an elevation of 3,732 feet (1,138 m). Its arcology concept was proposed by the Italian-American architect Paolo Soleri (1919–2013). He began construction in 1970, to demonstrate how urban conditions could be improved while minimizing the destructive impact on the Earth. He taught and influenced generations of architects and urban designers who studied and worked with him there to build the proposed town. It is also the home of the Arcosanti FORM Music Festival.

== Overview ==
The goal of Arcosanti is to explore the concept of arcology, which combines architecture and ecology. The project has the goals of combining the social interaction and accessibility of an urban environment with sound environmental principles, such as minimal resource use and access to the natural environment. The project has been building an experimental town on 25 acres (10 ha) of a 4,060-acre (1,640 ha) land preserve, 860 acres (350 hectares) of which are owned by the Cosanti Foundation, with the remainder leased from the state.

Ground was broken in 1970 to begin construction on the site and has continued at a varying pace through the present. The most recently completed building was finished in 1989. The population has tended to vary between 50 and 150 people, many of them students and volunteers. The goal was for Arcosanti to house a population of 5,000 people. Thirteen major structures were built on the site, some several stories tall. One master plan, designed in 2001, envisioned a massive complex, called "Arcosanti 5000", that would dwarf the current buildings.

Many features are particular to the design and construction of Arcosanti. For example, tilt-up concrete panels are cast in a bed of silt acquired from the surrounding area, giving the concrete a unique texture and color that helps it blend with the landscape. Many panels were cast with embedded art. Most buildings are oriented southward to capture the sun's light and heat – roof designs admit the maximal amount of sunlight in the winter and a minimal amount during the summer. The structure built to shelter bronze-casting is built in the form of an apse, a quarter-sphere or semi-dome. The layout of all the buildings is intricate and organic, rather than the grid typical of most US cities, with the goals of maximal accessibility to all elements, a combination of increased social interaction and bonds, together with privacy for the residents.. Not all of the grounds are wheelchair accessible.

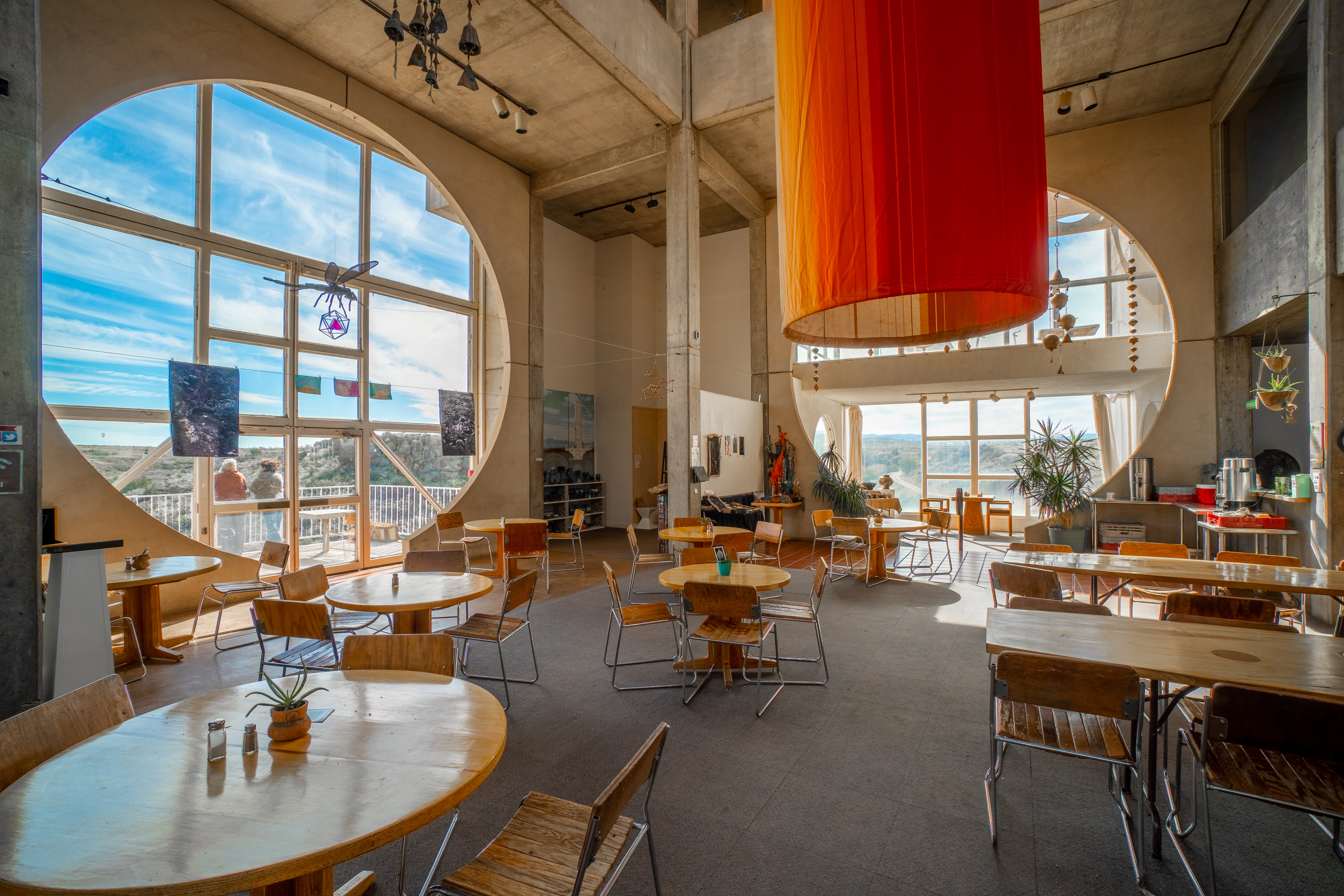
The cafe's dining area, two stories below the Arcosanti Visitors' Center and Gallery

Existing structures at Arcosanti are meant to begin to provide for the complete needs of a community. They include: a five-story visitors' center/cafe/gift shop; a bronze-casting apse; a ceramics apse; two large barrel vaults; a ring of apartment residences and quasi-public spaces around an outdoor amphitheater; a community swimming pool; an office complex, above which is an apartment that was originally Soleri's suite. A two-bedroom "Sky Suite" occupies the highest point in the complex; it, as well as a set of rooms below the pool, is available for overnight guests. Most of the buildings have accessible roofs.

Arcosanti has a Camp area, built by and for the original construction crew. It was used for many decades as housing for approximately one fourth of the Arcosanti population. Camp has a small greenhouse, with easy access to gardens and large agricultural fields. Formal agricultural activities ended December 31, 2025. Terraced greenhouses were planned along the slope of the main building site for winter plant and garden space, and to collect heat to distribute through the buildings.

Arcosanti was conceived of and remained primarily an education center during the active years of the Foundation. Students from around the world visited to attend workshops, classes, and to assist with construction. Forty thousand tourists visited yearly. Tourists can still take a guided tour of the site or stay overnight in guest accommodations.

Currently Arcosanti funding comes from sales of bells made and cast from bronze on site. Until 2025, ceramic bells were created on site but that was terminated by the Board. Additional funding comes from donations and fees for tours. Much of the present construction at Arcosanti has been done by workshop participants and volunteers. The average salary at Arcosanti for much of its history was barely above minimum wage.

== Workshops ==
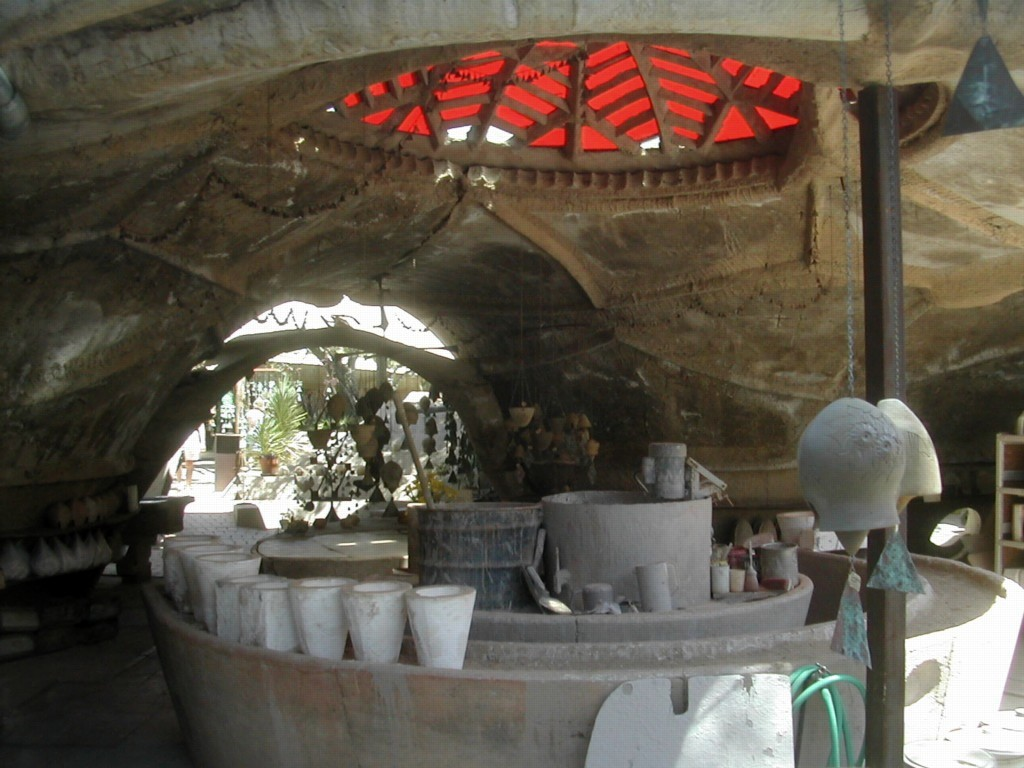
A work room

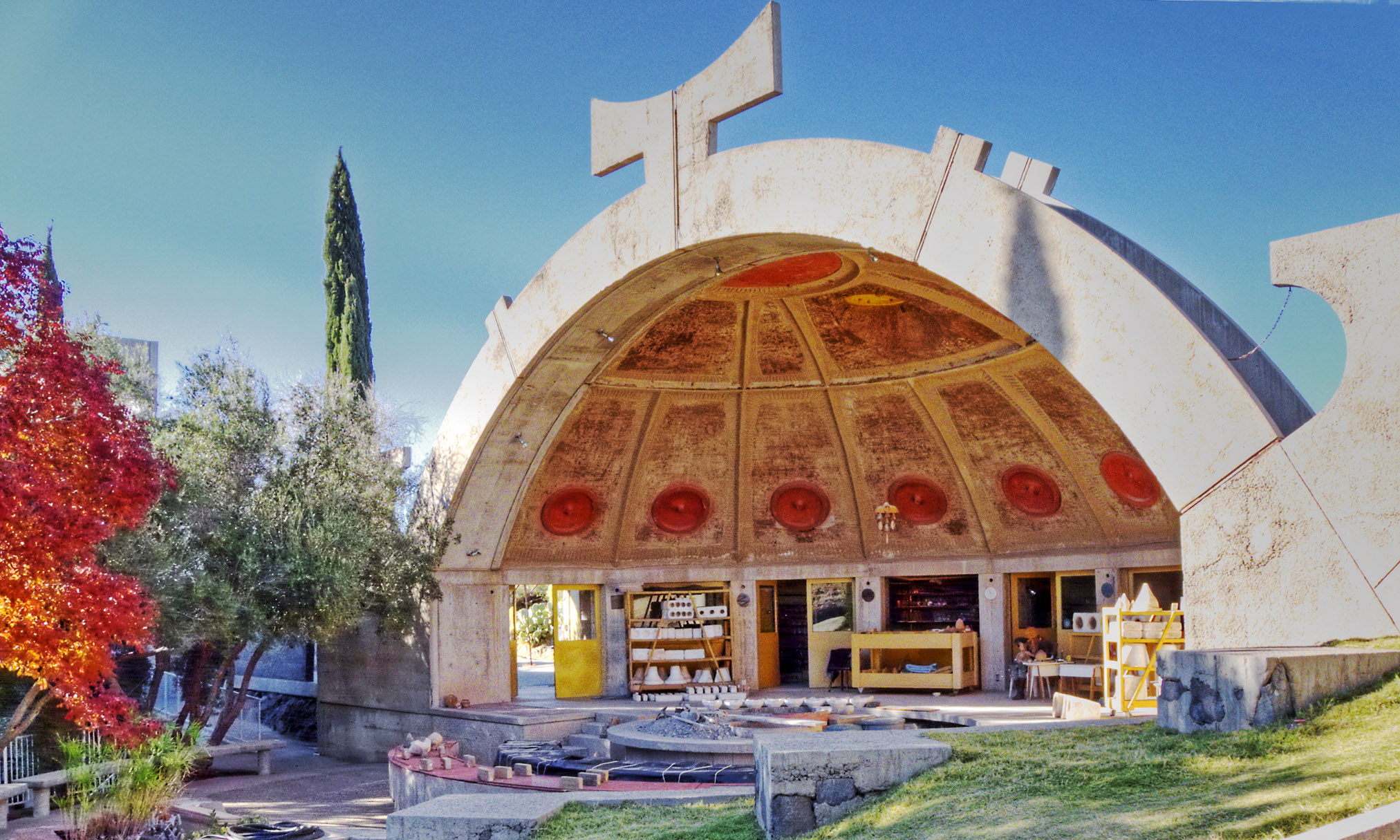
The Ceramics Apse

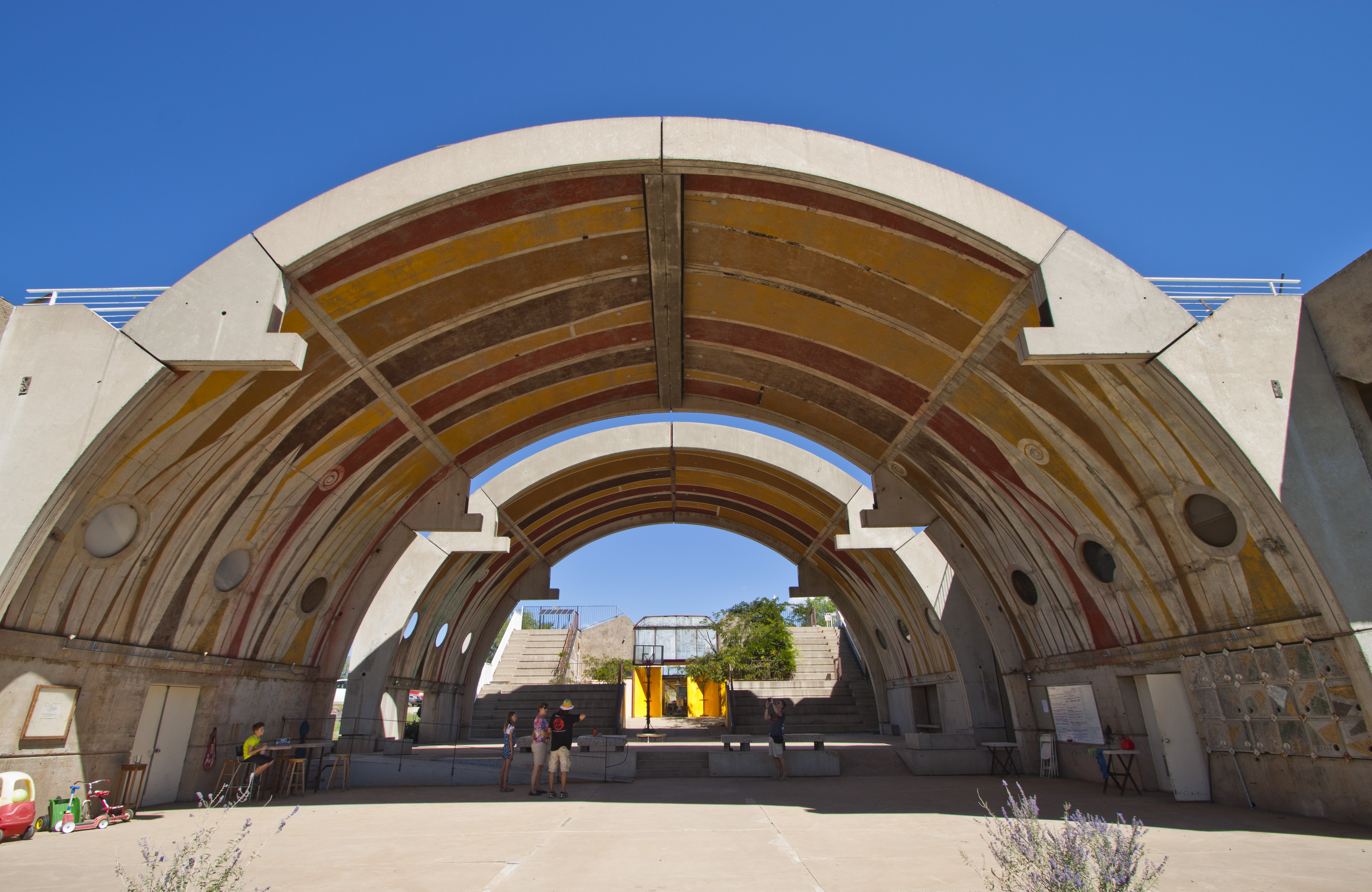
The Vaults

Starting in 1970, participants came to help build Arcosanti by enrolling in workshops. During the traditional five- or six-week workshop, they attended lectures about Paolo Soleri and the principles of Arcology design while gaining hands-on learning experience by aiding construction. Although the program attracted many who were interested in art, crafts, architecture and urban planning, it was also pertinent to those interested in philosophy, sociology, science, and agriculture. Most recently, workshops were shorter in duration, one week or less, and focused on learning, including experiential learning. Workshops were offered in glass blowing, siltcasting, photography and other hands-on activities. As of 2024, workshop activities have ceased at Arcosanti. As of Fall 2025, all volunteer opportunities have been eliminated.

In 2025, the Cosanti Foundation Board laid off around 80% plus of the Foundation team. Only a minimal level of maintenance and guest service activity is now ongoing, in effect moth balling the organization. Key leadership positions remain vacant including the Foundation Executive Director and Foundation Board Chair positions. In Fall 2025 Stephen Ostwinkle, the Foundation Board Treasurer, emailed the few remaining employees, that the Board would be taking the next year to identify a new direction. They hope to have a plan by the end of 2026.

== History ==
- 1956: Paolo and Colly Soleri purchased the land in Paradise Valley, Arizona, upon which the Cosanti studios were built. Their first official activities began there in 1959.
- 1969: Arcosanti – Soleri coined the term "Arcology" to describe his designs for ecologically sound human habitats, as elaborated in The City in the Image of Man, published by MIT Press to accompany a 1970 exhibition of the same name at the Corcoran Gallery in Washington, DC. The book develops the concept of Arcology and its design variations for different settings. Arcosanti, introduced as the last (30th) example of this exercise, was originally planned to house a relatively small population of 1,500 people. The physical construction of Arcosanti began in 1970.
- 1975–1977: Two Suns Arcosanti – The Xerox Corporation sponsored a major Soleri exhibition, featuring a series of new arcology designs that suggested a sustainable urban habitat employing alternative energy sources. The project was called Two Suns Arcology: The Cities Energized by the Sun. The Arcosanti master plan went through a major overhaul reflecting this methodology. In the following year, Plant Show venues gave Soleri additional funding to update the Arcosanti design. The projected population was increased to 5,000.
- 1978: During a festival held at the site on 7 October, a grass fire ignited in the area being used as a parking lot and over 180 cars were damaged or destroyed. This had the practical effect of ending the possibility of future music festivals at the site, due to the massive cost in damage payouts.
- 1980: Critical Mass – Ten years into the construction of the first prototype arcology, a developmental adjustment was made to gain momentum for the project. The Critical Mass concept was introduced as an incremental phase to house 10 percent of the projected population of 5,000. A series of small-scale structures, providing various amenities, were designed to support a viable community. This was intended to support the next major step, the completion of Arcosanti.
- 1988: Nightfall – The science fiction film Nightfall was filmed at Arcosanti. Residents served as extras.
- 2001: Arcosanti 5000 – Developed from the Super Critical Mass in "Arcosanti 2000", with the design elements of "Nudging Space Arcology" added, Arcosanti 5000 features seven phases of truncated super-apse structures. It re-establishes the macro nature of this prototype arcology for 5,000 people. This design is in development, awaiting architectural and structural resolutions.
- 2009: Paolo Soleri's 90th Birthday Celebration and Alumni Reunion – Paolo Soleri celebrated his 90th birthday at Arcosanti, joined by 300 alumni and guests for the occasion. The official schedule started on June 19; this first day was devoted to alumni. Ongoing events included Kundalini yoga, a morning bell-carving workshop, a silent auction, and an exhibition with the newest renderings of Critical Mass. The festivities continued into the night with a bronze pour in the Foundry, followed by a techno party in the Vaults, and performances on a stage in the Ceramics Apse.
  The birthday celebration for Soleri resumed on Saturday with attendees partaking in a gargantuan "frugal soup" gathering in the Vaults. Documentary film maker Geoffrey Madeja presented a short video. Tomiaki Tamura followed with a visual presentation of Paolo's life and work and a pictograph especially choreographed for Soleri. The final performance of the night was hosted by Flam Chen, in a series of acrobatics involving dazzling fire, lights, and extreme heights.
- 2011: On July 14, 2011, the Cosanti Foundation announced that its founder Soleri had retired as its President and CEO. "There are other things that I want to accomplish," said the 92-year-old Soleri. "I am ready to leave the management of the Foundation and its primary project – the urban laboratory Arcosanti – to the next generation." That generation was to be led by Boston architect Jeff Stein, AIA. Stein's proposals for Arcosanti began with: a half-dozen new apartment buildings; a canopy for the amphitheater; a renovated commercial bakery; and a storage unit for Paolo Soleri's collection of architectural models.

Arcosanti operates under aegis of the Cosanti Foundation, a non-profit 501(c)(3) organization. The Foundation ran workshops to teach Paolo Soleri's ideas. As of 2024, more than 8,000 participants had aided in the construction through participation in five-week workshops. Each workshop included a Seminar Week, which covered Soleri's background and history, as well as his concepts about arcology design. They heard lectures from different departments at Arcosanti to see how Arcosanti operates, and then spent the following weeks working at the priority project of the site.

Arcosanti is the home of the bronze bell-making enterprise of Cosanti Originals, which sells Soleri's sculptural wind bells to support the greater architectural project.

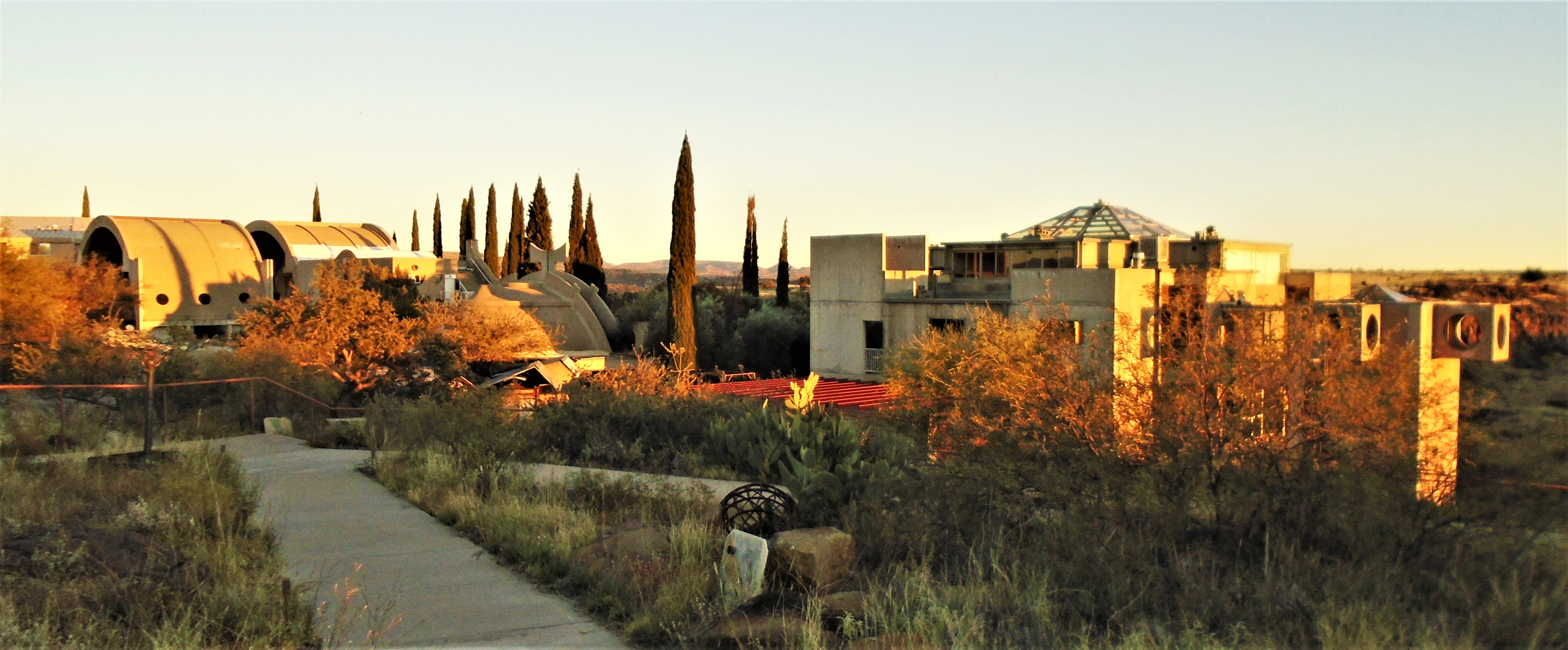
Arcosanti at the golden hour: The Vaults (left) and the Crafts III building (right), with the Ceramics Apse hidden between them.

== In popular culture ==
- Over six years in the making, the (2013) feature-length documentary film on the life of Paolo Soleri and the birth of Arcosanti, The Vision of Paolo Soleri: Prophet in the Desert (2012) features on-camera interviews with journalist Morley Safer, Will Wright, architectural critic Paul Goldberger, Catherine Hardwicke, Will Bruder, Jean-Michel Cousteau, architect Steven Holl, and Eric Lloyd Wright.
- In February 2022, Arizona hip-hop group Injury Reserve released a music video for their song "Outside," shot on location at Arcosanti.

== See also ==
- Paolo Soleri Amphitheater
- Sustainable city
- Biosphere 2
