= Rachna Shroff =

American doctor and oncologist (1979–2026)

- Undated image of Shroff
- Born: Rachna Trivedi; May 8, 1979; New York City, U.S.
- Died: October 11, 2026 (aged 47)
- Organizations: American Society of Clinical Oncology

Academic background
- Education: Brown University (BS); Thomas Jefferson University (MD); University of Texas (MS)

Academic work
- Discipline: Oncology
- Sub-discipline: Gastrointestinal oncology
- Institutions: MD Anderson Cancer Center, University of Houston

Rachna T. Shroff (née Trivedi; May 8, 1979 – October 11, 2026) was an American medical doctor and oncologist who served as the John F. and Valli S. Duval Endowed Professor in Gastrointestinal Oncology at the University of Arizona. She was best known for her work on cholangiocarcinoma and other gastrointestinal cancers. Shroff also endowed an award for investigators analyzing cancers of the bile duct.

== Early life and career ==
Rachna Trivedi was born in New York City on May 8, 1979, to a father who was a biochemist and a mother who was a nephrologist, both of Indian heritage, and raised in Tucson, Arizona. As a high school student she was awarded a fellowship in which she was able to work in the lab of an oncologist at the University of Arizona. She then earned a Bachelor of Science from Brown University and a Doctor of Medicine from Thomas Jefferson University.

She completed her fellowship at the MD Anderson Cancer Center, and subsequently worked as a professor there from 2010 to 2018. She simultaneously studied for and earned her MS in patient-based biological research, and was a competitive Bollywood dancer and choreographer as part of a troupe. She was an invitee at the 2014 Academy Awards.

Shroff began working at the University of Arizona in 2018, based in Tucson, Arizona, and worked closely with the oncologist she had worked in the lab of as a high school student. In March 2026, she was endowed the inaugural John F. and Valli S. Duval Endowed Professorship in Gastrointestinal Oncology, and served as the Associate Director of Clinical Investigations at the University of Arizona Cancer Center. She was also chief of the Department of Hematology/Oncology and served as associate dean for clinical and translational research.

She was best known for her work on cholangiocarcinoma, and KCRA-TV called her one of the most prominent experts on pancreatic cancer and cholangiocarcinomas. She was a fellow of the American Society of Clinical Oncology. She was called by news organizations to discuss the utility of daraxonrasib.

== Illness and death ==
In May 2026, she was diagnosed with cancer after finding a swollen lymph node. Doctors first suspected lymphoma, but it turned out to be adenocarcinoma originating from the stomach or intestine area. She continued to work, however, attending a major cancer research conference in October to share more information on her research. She also fundraised $1,350,000 to create an award, the "Conquer Cancer–Rachna Shroff, MD, MS, FASCO Young Investigator Award in Biliary Cancer". She died from complications of her cancer on October 11, 2026, at the age of 47.
