= Cosanti =

Art gallery in Maricopa County, Arizona

Coordinates: 33°34′01″N 111°56′31″W

Cosanti

Cosanti is the gallery and studio of Italian-American architect Paolo Soleri, serving as his residence until his death in 2013. Located in Paradise Valley, Arizona, U.S., it is open to the public. Cosanti is marked by terraced landscaping, experimental earth-formed concrete structures, and sculptural wind-bells.

Soleri and his wife Colly established their residence there in 1956 on a five-acre site just a few miles from Taliesin West, where Soleri had studied under Frank Lloyd Wright ten years earlier. Built on the outskirts of Scottsdale, it is surrounded by a wealthy suburban neighborhood. In Italian, the name Cosanti "is a combination of the words for 'object' and 'before,' and it means, 'There are things more important than objects.'"

In 1970, Soleri outgrew the site. He had coined "arcology" by combining architecture and ecology; then, combining "arcology" with "Cosanti", he founded Arcosanti, an "urban laboratory" in the desert seventy miles north, for which he became famous. As students and the frontier of development moved there, Cosanti became the headquarters and namesake of Soleri's foundation.

The structures at Cosanti include the original "Earth House", a student dormitory, outdoor studios, performance space, a swimming pool, gift shop, and Soleri's residence. All are set amidst courtyards, terraces and garden paths.

Cosanti

Many structures are partly underground and surrounded by mounds of earth for insulation, moderating their interior temperatures year-round. Soleri designed and built south-facing apses (partial domes) as passive energy collectors that collect light and heat in the lower winter sun, deflecting it and creating shade in the higher summer sun. The swimming pool and several other structures have southern exposures to maximize the warmth of the winter sun.

Cosanti predates the concept of arcology, but many principles of arcology were first implemented at Cosanti. Most of the structures were built with variations on earthcasting. Concrete was poured over mounds of densely packed earth; the earth was excavated after the concrete solidified. A modified earthcasting technique is also used to craft the bronze and ceramic wind-bells produced at Cosanti and Arcosanti on weekday mornings.
