= The Vision of Paolo Soleri: Prophet in the Desert =

- Directed by: Lisa Scafuro
- Produced by: Lisa Scafuro
- Starring: Paolo Soleri; Will Bruder; Jean-Michel Cousteau; Paul Goldberger; Catherine Hardwicke; Steven Holl; Elizabeth Mock Kassler; Charles Montooth; Morley Safer; Eric Lloyd Wright; Will Wright
- Narrated by: JP White
- Cinematography: Sam Shin
- Edited by: Lisa Scafuro; Eric Sernrot
- Music by: Thirty Seconds to Mars; Andrea Bocelli; CKY; Justin Salter
- Production company: Mona Lisa Film Productions
- Release dates: October 19, 2013 (Architecture & Design Film Festival)
- Country: United States
- Language: English

The Vision of Paolo Soleri: Prophet in the Desert is a 2013 American documentary film about the life and work of the late Italian architect and environmentalist Paolo Soleri. It was directed by Lisa Scafuro.

== Synopsis ==
The documentary focuses on the life of influential architect, environmentalist and philosopher Paolo Soleri. An Italian native, Soleri was born in 1919 and traveled to the United States in the 40s to meet and mentor with Frank Lloyd Wright. During the source of the film Scafuro features several interviews and ponders what might come of mankind and architecture in a world dealing with so many crises.

== Production ==
Scarfuro first showed an interest in creating a documentary about Soleri after befriending him at his studio in August 1996. She approached Ken Burns at the unveiling of the PBS documentary Frank Lloyd Wright with the intent of asking him to film the documentary, only for Burns to recommend that Scarfuro herself work on the documentary as he was booked up a decade in advance for projects. Scarfuro began filming around 2004 and ended filming in early 2012. The majority of the film was shot in Arizona, with various on-camera interviews and pickup shots filmed in New York City, Washington DC (When Soleri was honored at The White House), Italy, and California. For the narration, Scafuro chose to use Swedish musician & artist JP White from the rock band Vains of Jenna.

The Vision of Paolo Soleri took Scafuro seven years to complete. Editing and post-production on the film was completed in mid-2013, but Soleri was able to view a rough cut of the film on his final birthday, June 21, 2012. Soleri enjoyed the film and gave it his approval, telling Scafuro "Bravo."

== Release ==
The film has so far been screened at the Architecture & Design Film Festival NY, The New Hope International Film Festival, The Sofia Independent Film Festival (Bulgaria), and a private screening at Taliesin West.
