= Line and Space =

Architectural design firm

Line and Space, LLC. Architects
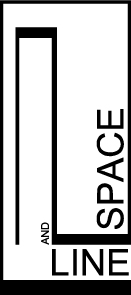
- Line and Space logo
- Industry: Architecture
- Founded: 1978
- Founder: Les Wallach, FAIA
- Headquarters: Tucson, Arizona
- Area served: International
- Services: Architecture, Interior Design, Masterplanning and Landscape Design
- Owners: Bob Clements, AIA; Henry Tom, FAIA, NCARB; Johnny Birkinbine III, AIA; Jared Logue, AIA, NCARB
- Website: www.lineandspace.com

Line and Space is an architectural design firm founded in 1978, by Les Wallach, FAIA, and headquartered in Tucson, Arizona. They have completed projects internationally and are known for their ecologically-sound buildings.

In 2007 Line and Space extended its services internationally when the company was selected to design a series of luxury villas in Shenzhen, China. The project included the design of several housing prototypes, a corporate retreat, and community center along the hillside of Tianqin Bay. The “Cascading Residences” as they have come to be known, were a catalyst for the firm’s future work in China. Since then, Line and Space has completed projects in the cities of Xiamen, Kunming, Chongqing, and Nanjing.

== Projects ==
- Boyce Thompson Arboretum State Park Visitor Center, Superior, Arizona (1988)
- The Arroyo House, Tucson, Arizona (1989)
- Arizona-Sonora Desert Museum Restaurant and Gallery Complex, Tucson, Arizona (1993)
- National Historic Trails Interpretive Center, Casper, Wyoming (2002)
- Cesar Chavez Regional Library, Phoenix, Arizona (2007
- University of Arizona Poetry Center, Tucson, Arizona (2007)
- Red Rock Canyon Visitor Center, Red Rock Canyon National Conservation Area outside of Las Vegas, Nevada, (2010)
- Cascading Residences, Tianqin Bay, Shenzhen, China, (2013)
- San Diego National Wildlife Refuge Complex, Chula Vista, California (2011)
- The Two, Xiamen, China (2011)
- Liangjiang Golf Club, Chongqing, China (2016)
- Pima Animal Care Center Expansion and Remodel, Tucson, Arizona (2017)

== Awards ==
- The Committee on the Environment (COTE) Top Ten Award for the Boyce Thompson Arboretum (1991)
- The Committee on the Environment (COTE) Top Ten Award for the Cesar Chavez Regional Library (2008)
- AIA Arizona, Sustainable Firm of the Year (2009)
- $25,000 First Prize Award from the National Endowment for the Arts for Skymarkers, a Gateway to Tucson, Arizona.
- Named New Landmark Libraries by the publication Library Journal for the Cesar Chavez Regional Library (2011) and the University of Arizona Poetry Center (2012)
- AIA Arizona Firm of the Year Award (2011)
- AIA Arizona, Twenty Five Year Award for The Arroyo House (2015)
