= Paolo Soleri Amphitheater =

Former outdoor theater in Santa Fe, New Mexico

- Interactive map of Paolo Soleri Amphitheater
- Address: 1501 Cerrillos Road; Santa Fe
- Coordinates: 35.672358°N 105.967787°W
- Capacity: 650 (est.)

Construction
- Opened: 1970
- Closed: 2010
- Architect: Paolo Soleri

The Paolo Soleri Amphitheater is an amphitheater in Santa Fe, New Mexico, which opened in 1970 and closed in 2010. The structure, which was never considered finished, was designed by Italian architect Paolo Soleri.

== History ==
The amphitheater was built in Santa Fe in the late 1960s on the campus of what was at the time the Institute of American Indian Arts and is now the campus of the Santa Fe Indian School. The concrete structure was created using Soleri's methods of earth-forming to create a type of desert-scape. The venue's wing-like, organic shapes emerge from a bowl-shaped depression in the high desert floor. Soleri's design was influenced by Native American themes. Seating only about 650, the small theater hosted notable North American performers including Carlos Santana, Stevie Ray Vaughan, Crosby, Stills, and Nash, Widespread Panic, Phish, and Leonard Cohen In later years, in the absence of the establishment of the educational courses for which it was intended, an inclusive Native Performance and Expressive Arts training program, theater operations became unprofitable. The last performance hosted at the venue was a concert by Lyle Lovett on July 29, 2010.

== Preservation ==
In 2011, the amphitheater was marked for demolition by the Santa Fe Indian School, which cited maintenance costs of about $100,000 per year and said that the amphitheater is only used twice a year. Because the amphitheater is managed by the nineteen Native American Pueblos of New Mexico, it is not protected by state or local preservation laws. No schedule for the structure's demolition has been set and a "Save the Soleri Amphitheatre" initiative on the part of Santa Fe Indian School alumni has inspired a movement to preserve the unique building.

As of 2022, the structure is still standing, but is not publicly accessible.
