= University of Arizona Cancer Center =

US cancer research institute

University of Arizona Cancer Center is a National Cancer Institute (NCI) designated cancer institute in Tucson, Arizona. The center is associated with the Banner University Medical Center Tucson and is located on the University of Arizona campus in Tucson. It is the only NCI-Designated Comprehensive Cancer Center located in Arizona.

== History ==
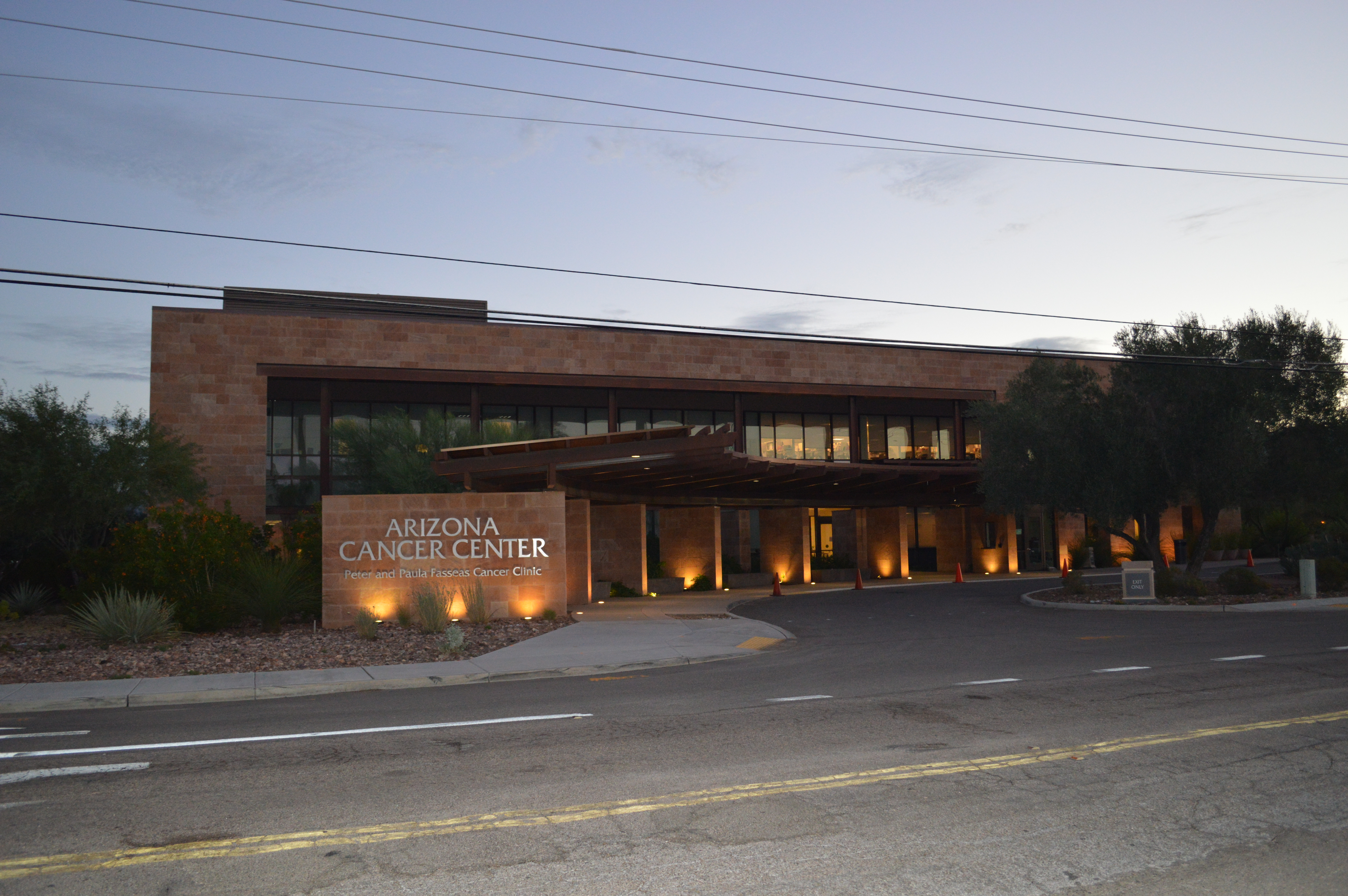
Arizona Cancer Center - Peter and Paula Fasseas Cancer Clinic

The center was founded by Sydney Salmon who served as the director from 1976 until 1999. David Alberts was a founding member of the center. In 1978, the center received its first support grant from the NCI. It received a comprehensive designation from NCI in 1990. In 2000, English musician Paul McCartney donated $1,000,000 for cancer research at the center, where his wife Linda McCartney received treatment. The donations were made on the condition that no animals would be used for testing since Linda was an animal rights activist. Jennifer Barton, a biomedical engineer, is associated with the center.

== Centers and initiatives ==
- Ginny L. Clements Breast Cancer Research Institute
- Skin Cancer Institute
- Cancer Engineering Initiative

== Research programs ==
- Cancer Biology Program
- Cancer Prevention and Control Program
- Developmental Therapeutics Program

== Notable former employees ==
- Rachna Shroff (died 2026)

== See also ==
- Arizona Cancer Center Chapel
