= Gorki (Kazan Metro) =

Kazan Metro Station

Gorki (Tawlar)
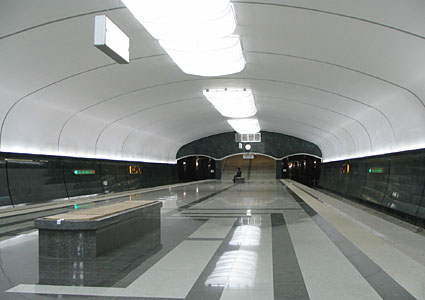

General information
- Coordinates: 55°45′35″N 49°11′29″E
- Owner: Kazan Metro
- Platforms: 1 Island platform
- Tracks: 2

History
- Opened: 27 August 2005

Services
Preceding station	Kazan Metro	Following station
Ametyevo towards Aviastroitelnaya	First Line	Prospekt Pobedy towards Dubravnaya
Location

Gorki (Russian and Tatar: Горки) is a station of the Kazan Metro. Opened as part of the first stage on 27 August 2005 it was (until December 2008) the southeastern terminus of the system. Located in the southeastern Gorki-1 microraion, the station presents a typical single-vault subsurface design.

Developed by architects A.Mustafin, R.Khisamov and T.Mukhametzyonov, the station's theme is a two-tone high-tech industrial design that blends with the surrounding Soviet-time Panel buildings. The station features a monolithic vault that is split into segments, and along its central axis run a set of lighting elements that create the steam effect.

The walls of the station are faced with dark green (Indiana grin) marble and behind their niches are additional lighting elements which illuminate the white vault. The floor of the station is covered by Mansurovsky and Starobabansky granite plates arranged in a geometrical pattern.

The station has two vestibules, located along the Rikhard Zorge street. The northern one has one exit towards the intersection of Zorge with Tankovaya and Malyurina streets, whilst the southern one, which was opened slightly later on 29 September 2005, is located under the intersection of Zorge with the Rodina (motherland) street.
