= Ametyevo (Kazan Metro) =

Kazan Metro Station

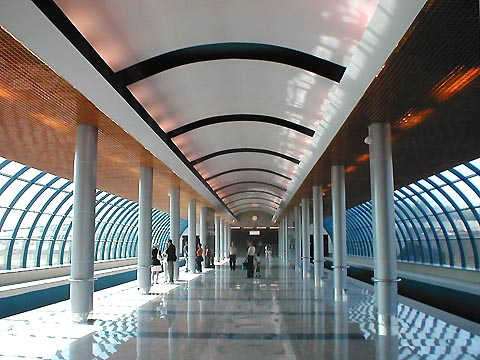

General information
- Coordinates: 55°45′54.3″N 49°10′00″E
- Owner: Kazan Metro
- Platforms: 1 Island platform
- Tracks: 2

Construction
- Structure type: Elevated

History
- Opened: 27 August 2005

Services
Preceding station	Kazan Metro	Following station
Sukonnaya Sloboda towards Aviastroitelnaya	First Line	Gorki towards Dubravnaya
Location

Ametyevo (Russian: Аметьево) is a station of the Kazan Metro. Opened as part of the first stage of the system on 27 August 2005. it is the only station that is not underground.

The path of the metro's first stage involved coming over a valley which divides two of Kazan's southeastern housing massifs: Ametyevo and Daurskoye-Tankodrom. The valley itself is now occupied by the Daurskaya street. Due to the relative ease at building a station on a flyover over the valley, the resulting project was adopted. Architects A.Mustafin and N.Romashkin-Timonov took the opportunity to develop a modern high-tech design. The overall theme is reminiscent of a futuristic cosmic weightless construction located in free space.

Engineeringly, the support comes from a standard railway bridge, that was modified into a two-tier causeway, which is completely enclosed in a blue glass frame. The glass itself is both thermally insulated and The top tier is located at ground level with both of the valley sides and is formally outside the Metro territory allowing pedestrians to cross the valley without entering the Metro. The Platform level was adjusted in a conventional geometry of the station such that it could be lowered to match the tunnel entrances from the valley sides.

The interior of the main platform hall compromises a pillar-trispan approach with two rows of 16 thin cylindrical columns and two long ones (which contain station information). Both the interior of the vestibules and the span above the tracks contains a continuous suspended ceiling of yellow opaque plastic, under which lies a row of lighting elements. The floor is covered by grey granite and blue ceramic granite.

The central span also contains a suspended ceiling, but is curved to create a vaulted shape. The large opaque white fragments are shaped to appear suspended from the blue vault. The main lighting elements are hidden behind the white opaque glass, and is turned on during the nighttime giving the station two distinctively separate aesthetics.

The station has two vestibules, built as large white structures on both sides of the valley, the northern one also offers a direct subway access to the Ametyevo platform of the railway line, the transfer was opened on 28 August 2008 and included modernisation of the railway platform to a theme similar of the Metro station.

Just after Ametyevo is a junction which branches off to the Daurskoye depot of the system.

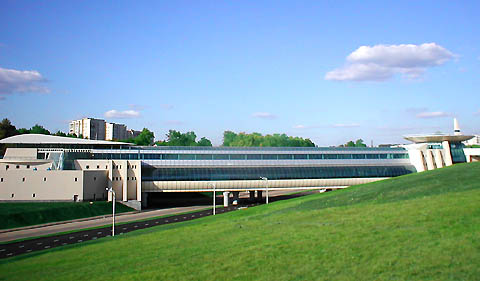
Exterior view of the station
