= Kremlyovskaya (Kazan Metro) =

Kazan Metro Station

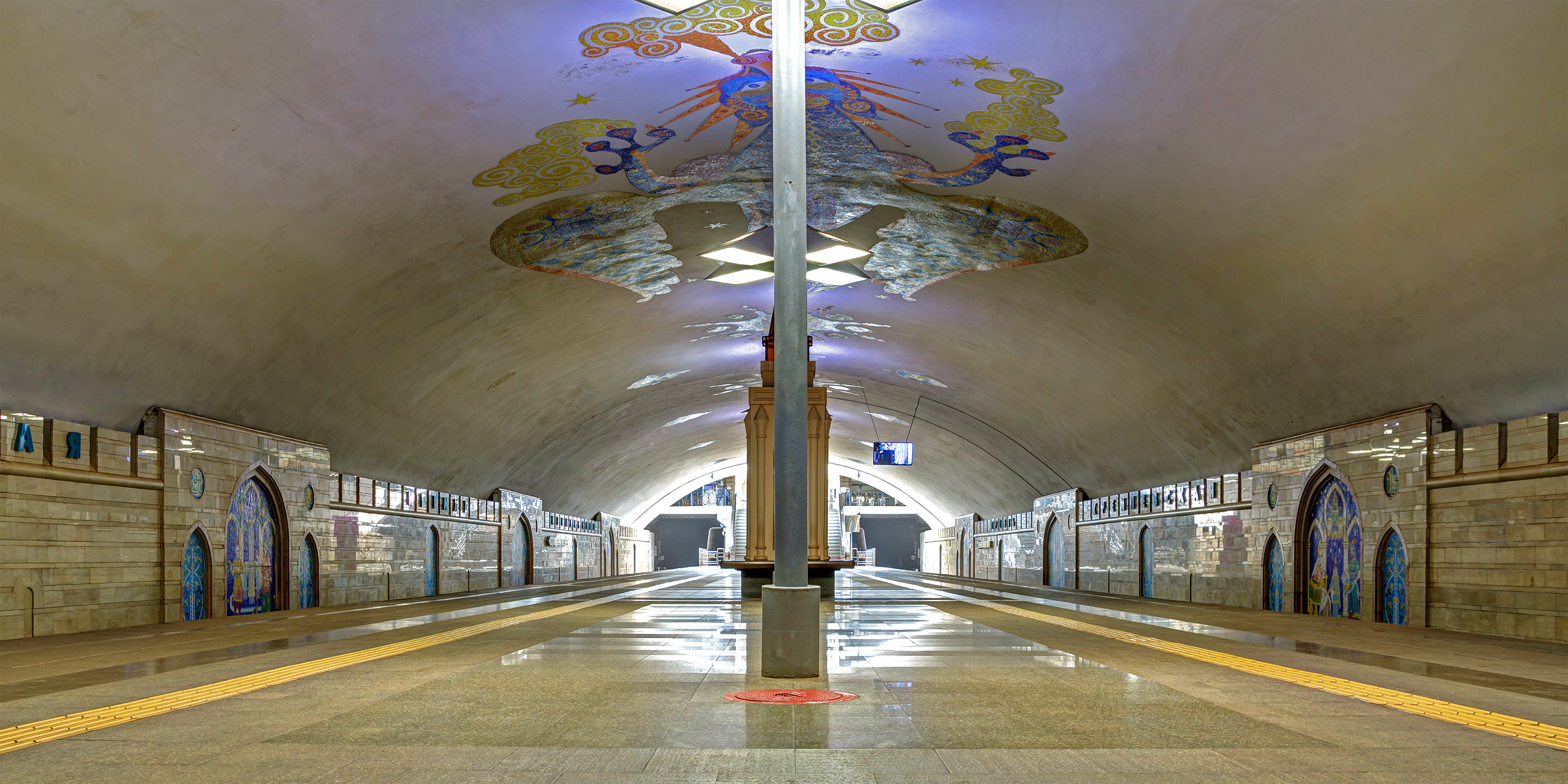

General information
- Coordinates: 55°47′43″N 49°06′26″E
- Owner: Kazan Metro
- Platforms: 1 Island platform
- Tracks: 2

History
- Opened: 27 August 2005

Services
Preceding station	Kazan Metro	Following station
Kozya Sloboda towards Aviastroitelnaya	First Line	Ploshchad Tukaya towards Dubravnaya
Location

Kremlyovskaya (Russian: Кремлёвская) is a station of the Kazan Metro. It was opened as part of the first stage of the system on 27 August 2005, as the system's northern terminus. The route has since been extended and it now serves as an intermediate stop.

Named after the Kazan Kremlin which is located nearby, architects R.Nurgalieva and S.Mamleyeva along with artist N.Khaziakhmetov incorporated a standard sub-surface single vault technology into the theme of the mythical fortress of the ancient Kazan Khanate. The station walls (which are made from real stone blocks), are faced with beige Janina marble, and arranged in a geometry to create a white stone illusion. The walls are further topped by defensive "teeth", behind which lie the lighting elements.

The walls themselves feature a set of "towers" and in their archways are mosaic artworks on the theme of everyday life in the Bulgarian and Kazan khanates. Whilst the archways located midway between the towers contain a similar mosaic which has inscribed Kazan - a white stone city in old Arabic Tatar, and in 15th-century Russian.

The central axis of the platform contains five hollow concrete towers. Having numerous openings each of which is concealed with stained glass, and topped with a different glass figure. When lit inside they create a very effective part of the ensemble, the central one of which is styled to resemble the Söyembikä Tower, the two furthest ones are topped with mausoleums and symbolise the history of the Kazan khanate, whilst the two interim ones are topped with minarets and symbolise the Islamic faith of the Tatars. Their practical role comes from them being surrounded by wooden benches.

Additional lighting comes from a set of four lampposts (spaced between the towers) each with four "petal" lamps that illuminate both the platform and the ceiling. The platform floor is faced with two sets of granite tiles a bright Jiltaw (Dzhiltau)) and a dark Kurtinsky, the geometrical pattern is further highlighted with parts of it being polished whilst other thermally treated to create a non-slip surface in interests of safety.

However the biggest contribution to the station's ensemble is its ceiling, left with bare white stucco (again to fit into the connotation of the medieval tunnels of the Kremlin), the ceiling is decorated with a set of fresco-mosaics decorated with Tatar ornaments and wild animals of Tatarstan. The central piece is a giant dragon Zilant - the symbol of Kazan, which spreads its wings and blows flames. The final piece of decoration is a large mosaic bas-relief which reads On the river lies a stone city - in Kazan many high gates in Tatar and Russian.

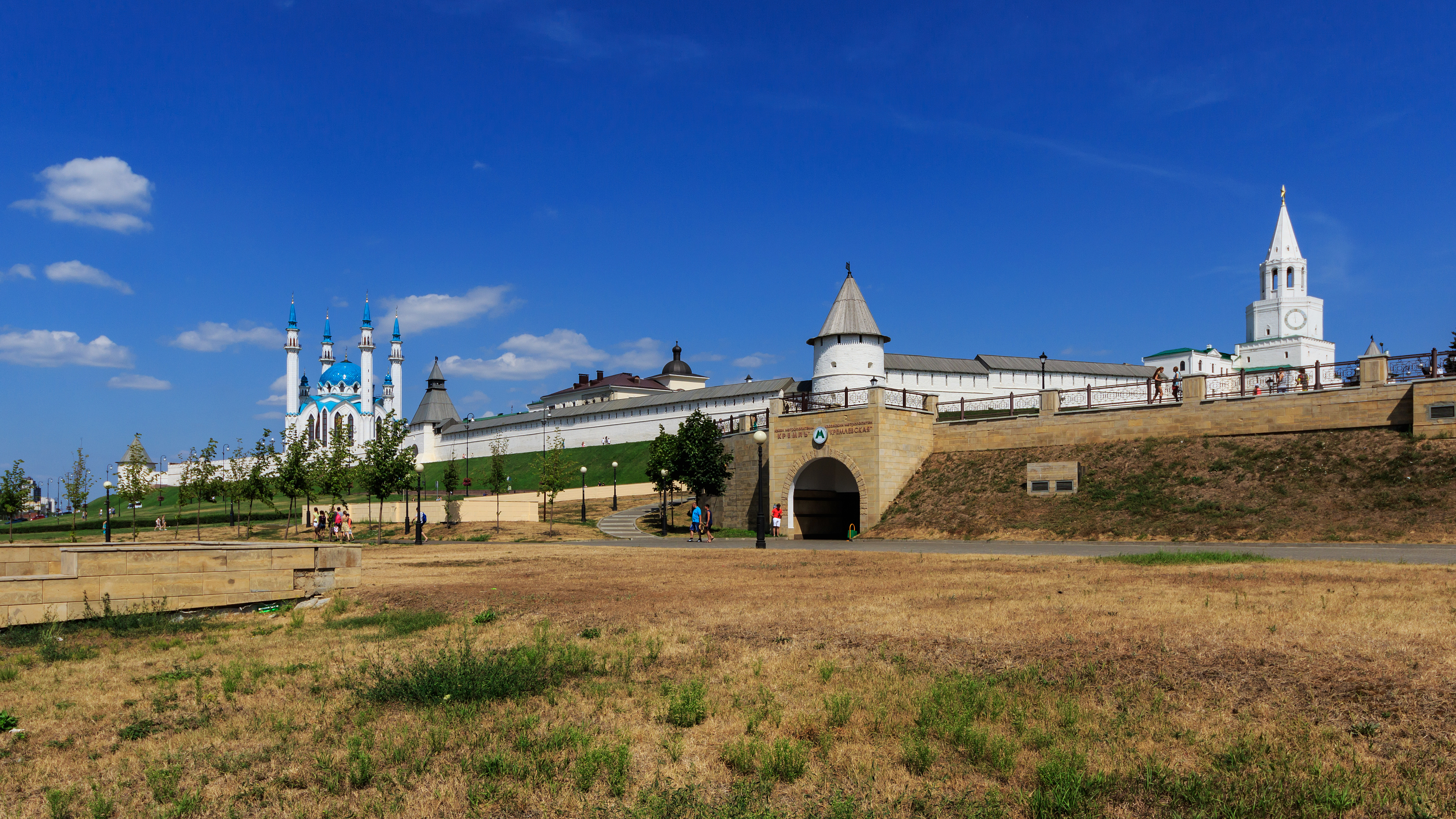
One of the entrances to Kremlyovskaya, with the Kremlin in the background

The station contains two underground vestibules, the northern one opened with the station whilst the southern one was completed later and opened only on 16 May the following year. Unlike the medieval theme of the platforms, the vestibules aesthetics contrast with high-tech finishes a set of domed glazed skylights and lifts for the disabled.

Northern vestibule offers access to the Kremlin itself, Profsoyuznaya (Profsoyuz), 1 May Streets, Bolaq embankments along with Millennium square, where the main portal is too styled in a large archway, and a sculpture of Zilant tops it. The southern vestibule offers immediate access to the Bauman Street, and is linked with two underground shopping centres. Thus it is possible to access the intersection between Profsoyuz and Chernyshevsky (Çernışevskiy) Streets via the two tier Kremlyovskaya gallery (shopping centre). There is also a step-free entrance to the Kazan gallery which runs under the Bauman street and has three entrances of its own where the street intersects with the Çernışevskiy and M. Dzhalilya (M. Calil) streets.

Apart from the mentioned Kremlin and galleries, located in the vicinity of the station are the Bolaq canal, Piramida complex, Mirazh hotel, State museum, Tatarstan Academy of Sciences, City council (Meriya). Further afield are the Central Stadium, Palace of Sports, Kazan Circuis, and the main Railway Terminal.
