= Prospekt Pobedy (Kazan Metro) =

Kazan Metro Station

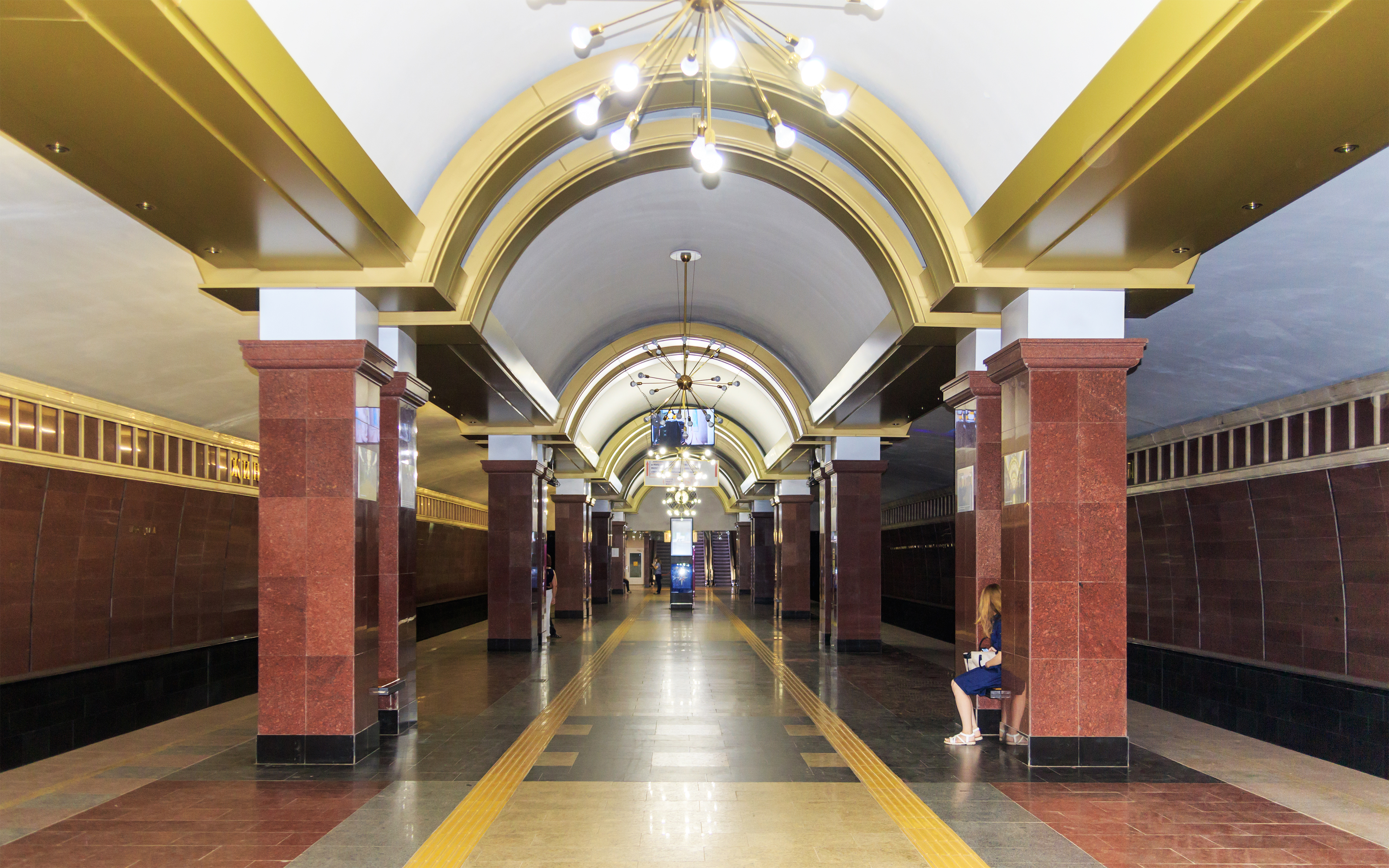

General information
- Coordinates: 55°44′59″N 49°12′29″E
- Owner: Kazan Metro
- Platforms: 1 island platform
- Tracks: 2

History
- Opened: 29 December 2008

Services
Preceding station	Kazan Metro	Following station
Gorki towards Aviastroitelnaya	First Line	Dubravnaya Terminus
Location

Prospekt Pobedy (Russian: Проспект Победы) is a station of the Kazan Metro. The station was to be the first extension of the system (the second stage) three years since its opening in 2005 and was opened on 29 December 2008.

The station is located in the Gorki-2 microraion, upon the intersection with the Richard Sorge street and the Victory avenue, for which the station is named. Its architectural ensemble (work of A.Mustafin) thus incorporates the Victory in the Great Patriotic War as the main theme, resulting in the flamboyant parade look that reminds of Stalinist Architecture past.

The standard pillar-trispan design forms two rows of triumphal arches running along both of the axis of the columns. Each archway (twelve in total) is dedicated to a Hero City in the former Soviet Union. The name of the city is carved into the glass located amid the pillar. The base of each column contains a wooden bench.

Both the station walls, and the pillars are faced in red marble, whilst the floor is laid in red white and black granite arranged in a special pattern. Lighting upon the central vault comes from a set of lamps arranged to symbolise the celebration fireworks.

The station has two underground vestibules, both with subway entrances on the Zorge street and the Victory avenue. Just in front of the station will be a cross junction, allowing trains to come and depart from the same platforms.

In perspective there are plans to continue the first line of the Metro to the 10th microdistrict, however that is far off, as the Metro has much more important extensions of the second stage northwards.

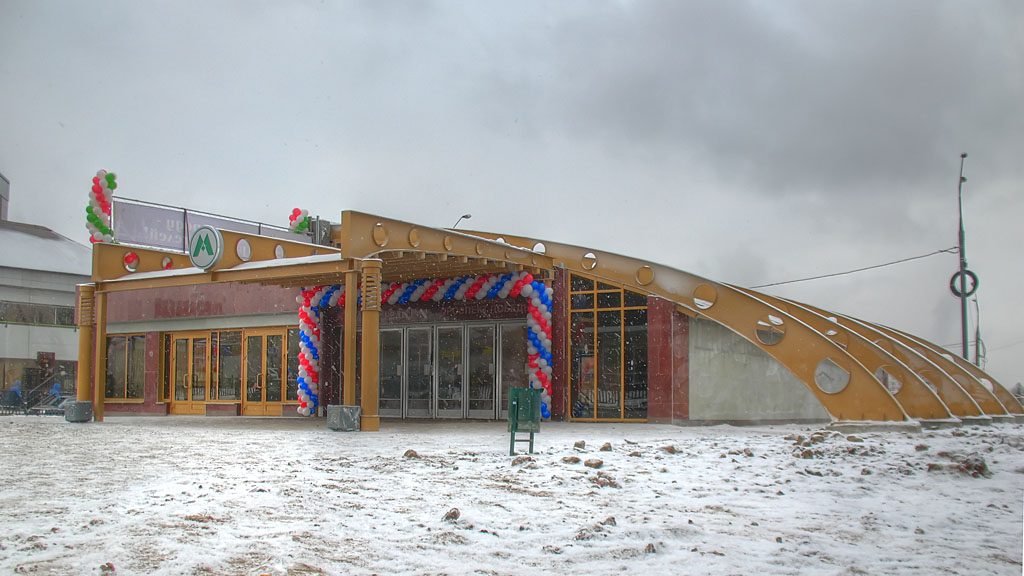
The southern entrance
