= Kozya Sloboda =

Kozya Sloboda may refer to:

- Kozya Sloboda (Kazan), a historical settlement within Kazan
- Kozya Sloboda (Kazan Metro), a station of the Kazan Metro
