= Yäşlek (Kazan Metro) =

Kazan Metro Station

Yäşlek Яшьлек
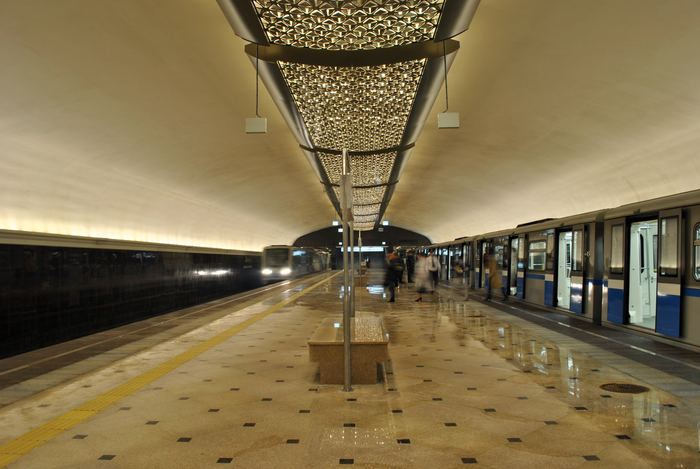

General information
- Coordinates: 55°49′44″N 49°04′53″E
- Owner: Kazan Metro
- Platforms: 1 Island platform
- Tracks: 2

History
- Opened: 9 May 2013

Services
Preceding station	Kazan Metro	Following station
Severny Vokzal towards Aviastroitelnaya	First Line	Kozya Sloboda towards Dubravnaya
Location

Yäşlek or Yashlek (Russian: Яшьлек; Tatar: Яшьлек – Youth) is a station on the Kazan Metro that opened on 9 May 2013. It was part of the northern extension of the Kazan Metro along with Severny Vokzal and Aviastroitelnaya that opened on 9 May 2013.
