= Kozya Sloboda (Kazan Metro) =

Kazan Metro Station

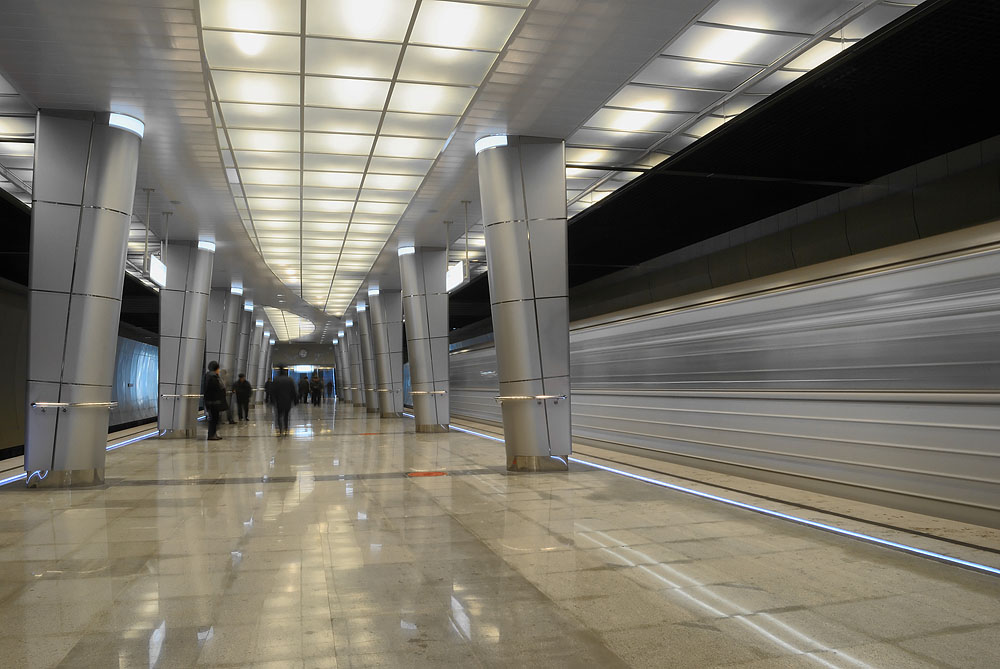

General information
- Coordinates: 55°48′55″N 49°05′56″E
- Owner: Kazan Metro
- Platforms: 1 Island platform
- Tracks: 2

History
- Opened: 30 December 2010

Services
| Preceding station | Kazan Metro | Following station |
|---|---|---|
| Yäşlek towards Aviastroitelnaya | First Line | Kremlyovskaya towards Dubravnaya |
Location

Kozya Sloboda (Russian: Ко́зья Слобода́) (Goats Village) is a station on the Kazan Metro that opened on 30 December 2010. It is the first station on the right bank of the Kazanka River. Construction on the station started in February 2006.

The station was set to be called Käcä Bistäse (Tatar: Кәҗә Бистәсе) or Kozya Sloboda (Russian: Ко́зья Слобода́), but in the wake of protests led in part by students of Kazan State Energy University the city government settled on the purely descriptive name Aq Bars (White Bars). The previous name, which translates roughly as Goat Settlement, was a traditional name for the region before it became a part of Kazan. Due to citizens' protests and online voting, however, the name was switched back to Kozya Sloboda. Other candidate names included Energouniversitet (Energy University) and Zarechye (Beyond the River Area).
