= Kazan Metro =

Subterranean rapid transit in Kazan, Russia

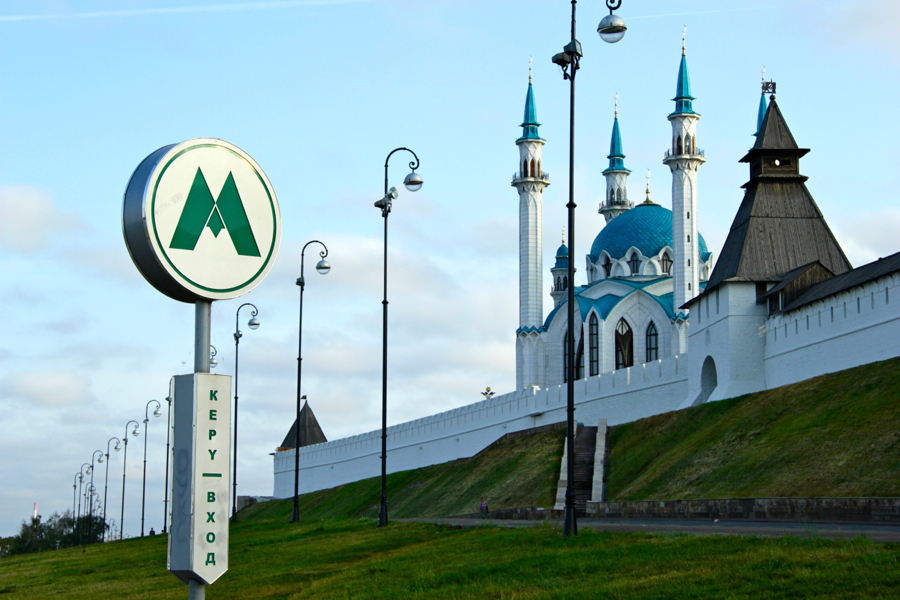
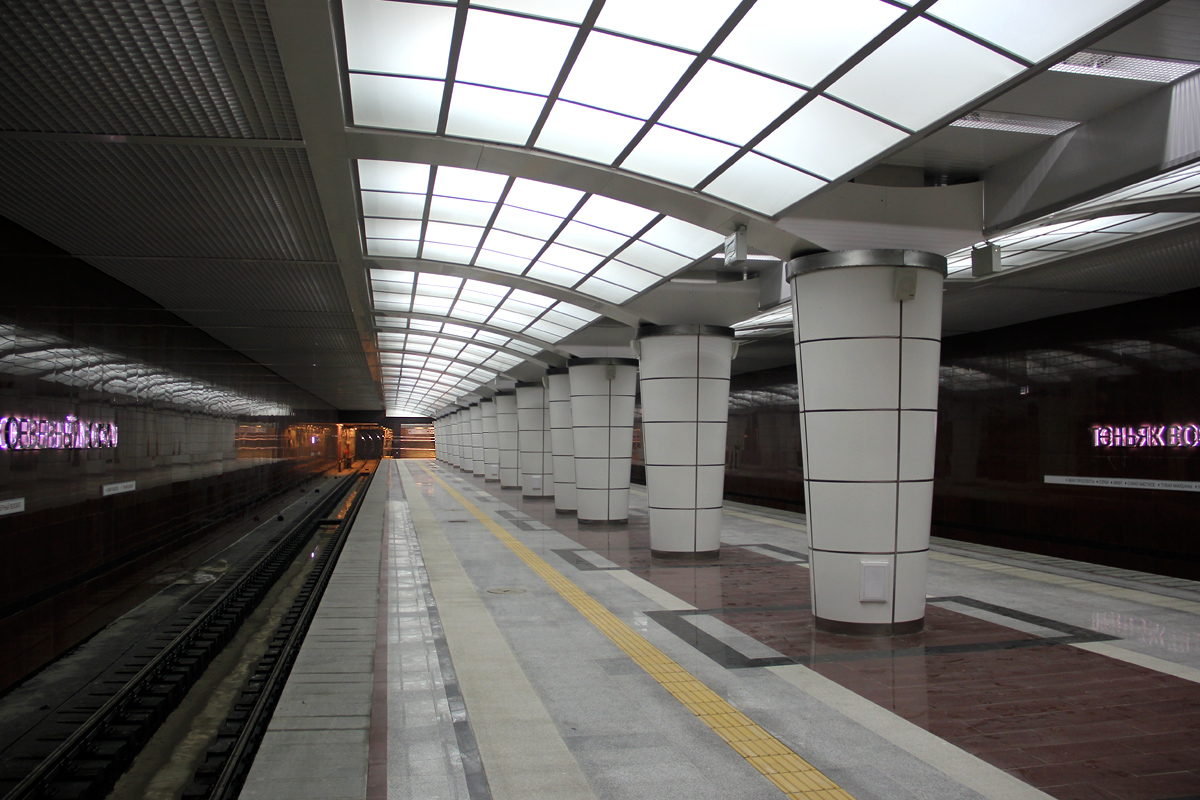

Overview
- Native name: Казанский метрополитен Kazansky metropoliten Казан метрополитены Qazan Metropolitenı
- Owner: Municipality of Kazan
- Locale: Kazan, Tatarstan, Russia
- Transit type: Rapid transit
- Number of lines: 1
- Number of stations: 11
- Daily ridership: 83.5 thousand (average)
- Annual ridership: 30.5 million (2022)
- Website: kazanmetro.ru

Operation
- Began operation: 27 August 2005; 21 years ago
- Operator: MetroElektroTrans
- Number of vehicles: 47

Technical
- System length: 16.8 km (10.4 mi)
- Track gauge: 1,524 mm (5 ft)
Kazan Metro network map
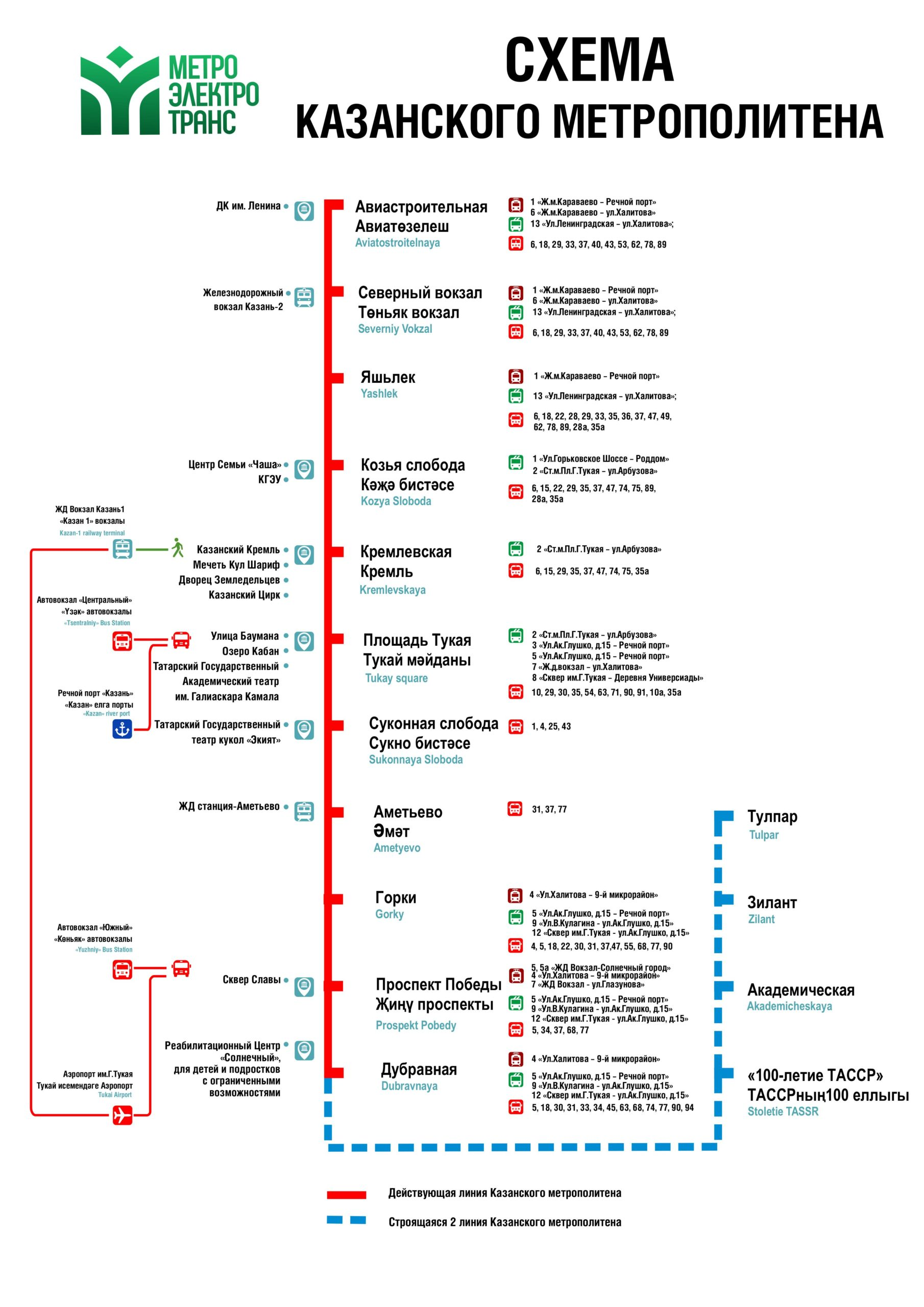
Includes the Savinovo-Azino Line

The Kazan Metro (Russian: Каза́нский метрополите́н; Tatar: Казан метросы, romanized: Qazan metrosı) is a rapid-transit system that serves the city of Kazan, Tatarstan, Russia. The metro system was the seventh opened in Russia, and the fifteenth in the former Soviet Union region. Opened on 27 August 2005, it is the newest system in Russia.

== History ==
=== Planning ===
Kazan is a historic and cultural centre on the middle Volga. The first plans to have a rapid-transit system were proposed back in the days of the Russian Empire, but after the October Revolution and the Russian Civil War, little was left for the design. Nevertheless, in the 1930s, Kazan, being the capital of the Tatar ASSR—one of the most visible autonomous republics and rapidly growing as an industrial centre—prompted some to propose a rapid transit system for the future, particularly after the successful construction of Moscow Metro in 1935.

However, World War II ended such attempts, and in the post-war USSR, only the largest capitals of Union republics could afford a Metro system. Nevertheless, in 1979 the Kazan city's population passed the one million mark: a Soviet requirement for a Metro to be allowed. 1983 was the year when the Supreme Soviet of the Tatar ASSR authorised planning a metro system. The original design was to prove the final one, as the City of Kazan effectively followed a typical Soviet model with a historical centre on the inflow of the Kazanka River into the Volga, and the various industrial and "bedroom" districts (housing complexes) on the edges. The first line would follow a north–south axis beginning in the Transit Railway Station in the north, passing through the post-war Stalinist buildings and then down south of the Kazanka, next to the Kazan Kremlin and through the historical centre to the microdistrict of Gorki.

The first geological survey began in 1984, and by 1989 the construction of the first stage was drawn up and submitted for final authorisation to begin construction. It was not to be. In 1991, the Soviet Union broke up and the economic, as well as political turmoil that rocked Tatarstan and Russia, caused the Kazan Metro project to be axed.

=== Construction ===
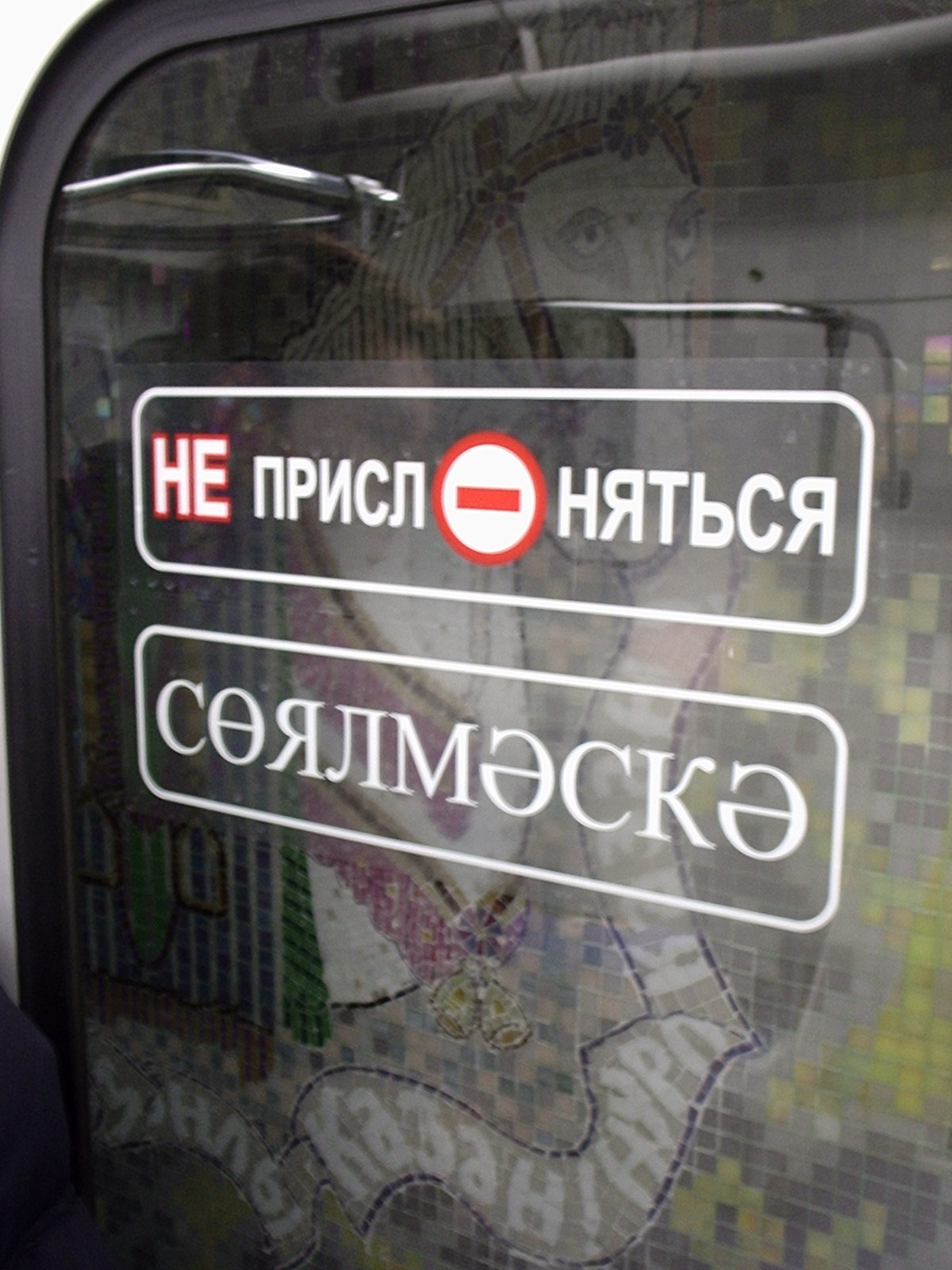
Bilingual signs on the doors of train "Do not lean on door"

Luckily for Kazan, throughout the 1990s, the status of it being the most visible autonomous capital reinforced its position; enough for the Federal government to issue a review of the project in 1995 and authorising the construction. The most prominent deadline was the city's millennium anniversary in 2005. After securing financing and training, the first stone was laid on 27 August 1997.

The first stage of six stations features deep-level tunnels all built by tunnel boring machines, and the stations are either sub-surface or elevated. Little of the original Soviet station plans remain in the architecture of the stations, with the emphasis being on traditional Tatar and Islamic motifs as part of modern high-tech designs. The first shield arrived in Kazan at the end of 1999 and was launched in May 2000.

Initially, the pace was slow and the financial problems were about to prevent the construction's on-time completion. In a desperate attempt, in late 2003 the Russian Ministry of Transport ordered metro brigades from Samara and Moscow to assist and the first stage was made one station shorter, leaving the difficult path under the Kazanka River to open at a later time. Another contribution was made by the Almaty Metro construction brigade from Kazakhstan. Thus, by the late 2004, a total of eight tunnel boring mechanisms were in operation. Overall, a total of thirteen individual tunnels had to be bored.

Despite a rocky start, Kazan Metro was opened on 27 August 2005 by the President of Russia Vladimir Putin, the President of Tatarstan Mintimer Shaymiyev, and the President of Kazakhstan Nursultan Nazarbayev, as well as the mayor of Kazan and the heads of all existing Russian Metros.

The extension to Prospekt Pobedy opened on 29 December 2008 as the first extension south of Gorki station in the second stage. In 2010 the Metro extended across the Kazanka River, with the opening of the Kozya Sloboda station. The Kazan metro opened a three-station northern extension on 9 May 2013.

== Operation ==
At present, the Kazan Metro is a single-line system that stretches nearly sixteen kilometres and has eleven stations. The newest of the Russian systems, it is also the most modern. Smart-card ticketing and semi-automatic train drive are features that at the time were just being introduced in selected Moscow stations. The system is operated by the municipality company MetroElektroTrans (МетроЭлектроТранс).

Like all Metros in Russia and the former USSR, each station has its own architectural theme. At present five stations are single-vault, and five are pillar-spans. In addition, one station exists on a combined glazed flyover.

== Service ==
The metro runs from 6:00 to 24:00. The metro also sells smart-tokens valid for one day and smart cards (passes) which are valid for several trips or a specified length of time. There are discounted fares for pensioners, students, and children. Security is a major issue in the Kazan Metro. Like all modern systems, it is outfitted with CCTV cameras. Each station has its own police group for public order. Professional photography is prohibited.

All information and announcements are given in three languages — Russian, Tatar, and English.

== Rolling stock ==
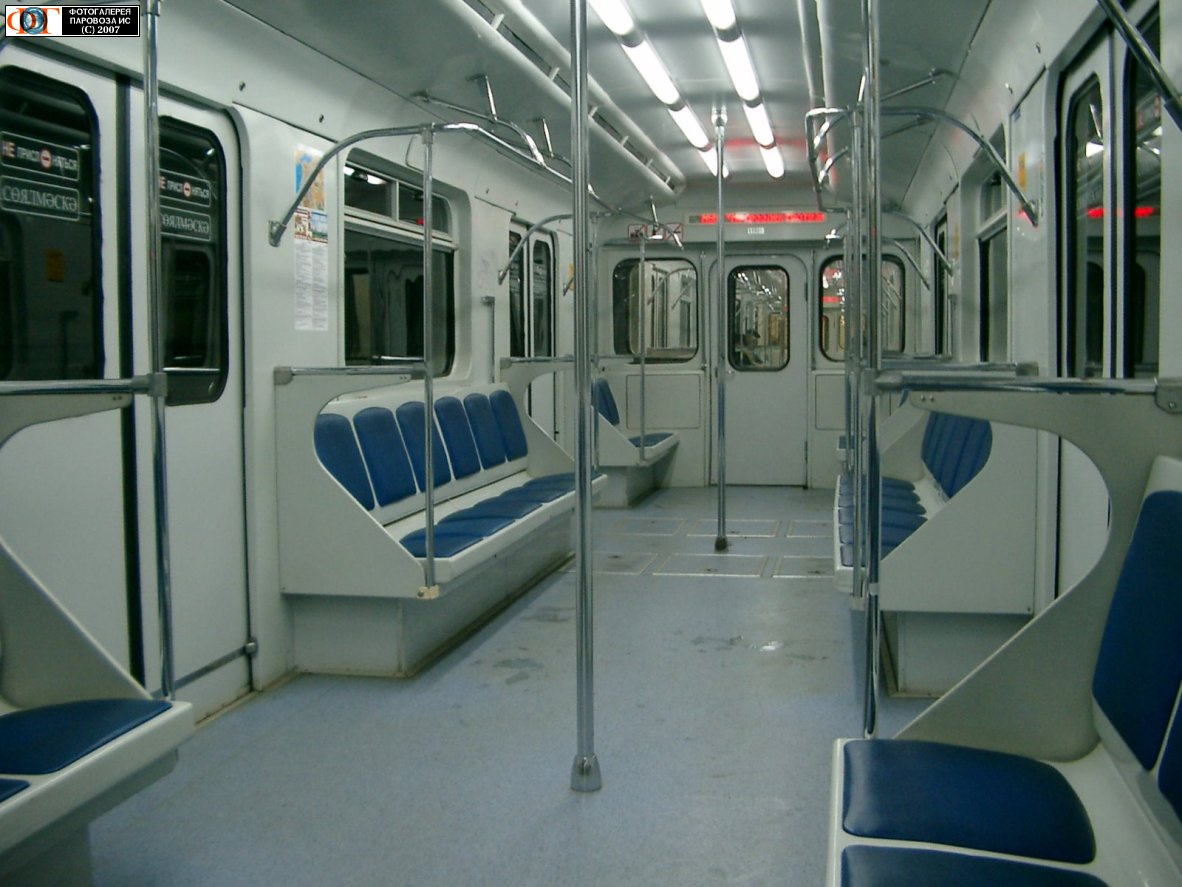
The interior of Kazan metro car

Only the 81-553.3/554.3 «Kazan» model was maintained in Kazan metro since 2005. Trains were produced by Saint Petersburg-based Vagonmash factory in cooperation with Škoda Dopravní Technika of Plzeň, Czech Republic in 2005. These are the most modern models currently in service in Russia and the former Soviet Union and they are fully automated. As a result, they do not require an engineer or a driver on board, just a supervisor. A total of 16 cars (4 trains) are currently in operation with a capacity of ~250 people each.

In 2011 new 3-car 81-740/741 «Rusich» trains were bought for opening of new Kozya Sloboda. A total of 27 cars (9 trains) are currently in operation with a capacity of ~350 people each. 12 trains (1 train is reserved) provide 5-minute intervals on the line in rush hours.

In 2019 a contract was signed by delivering one train of type 81-765/766/767. The train was built by April 2020 and was sent to Kazan by May 2020, and then that September it has entered service.

Today there are 14 train sets operating the metro, out of which 9 trains are three car train sets with gangways only in the certain cars. But the 81-765/766/767 is the only type to have gangways between every car.

== Lines ==
=== First line ===
Station	Image	Opened
Aviastroitelnaya; Russian language: Авиастроительная; Tatar: Авиатөзелеш		9 May 2013
Severny Vokzal; Северный Вокзал; Төньяк вокзал		9 May 2013
Yashlek; Яшьлек; Яшьлек		9 May 2013
Kozya Sloboda; Козья слобода Кәҗә бистәсе		30 December 2010
Kremlyovskaya; Кремлёвская; Кремль		27 August 2005
Ploshchad Tukaya; Площадь Тукая; Тукай мәйданы		27 August 2005
Sukonnaya Sloboda; Суконная слобода Сукно бистәсе		27 August 2005
Ametyevo; Аметьево; Әмәт		27 August 2005
Gorki; Горки; Горки		27 August 2005
Prospekt Pobedy; Проспект Победы; Җиңү проспекты		29 December 2008
Dubravnaya; Дубравная; Имәнлек		30 August 2018

=== Second line ===
A second line, with 12 planned stations in total, has been under construction since 2019. (Note: Preliminary work on the second line began in the middle of 2019. Construction work began near the end of 2019. The first tunnel boring machine was deployed in 2020.) The first four stations are expected to be completed by 2027.

== See also ==
- List of metro systems
