= Kazan Kremlin =

- Казанский кремль (Russian)
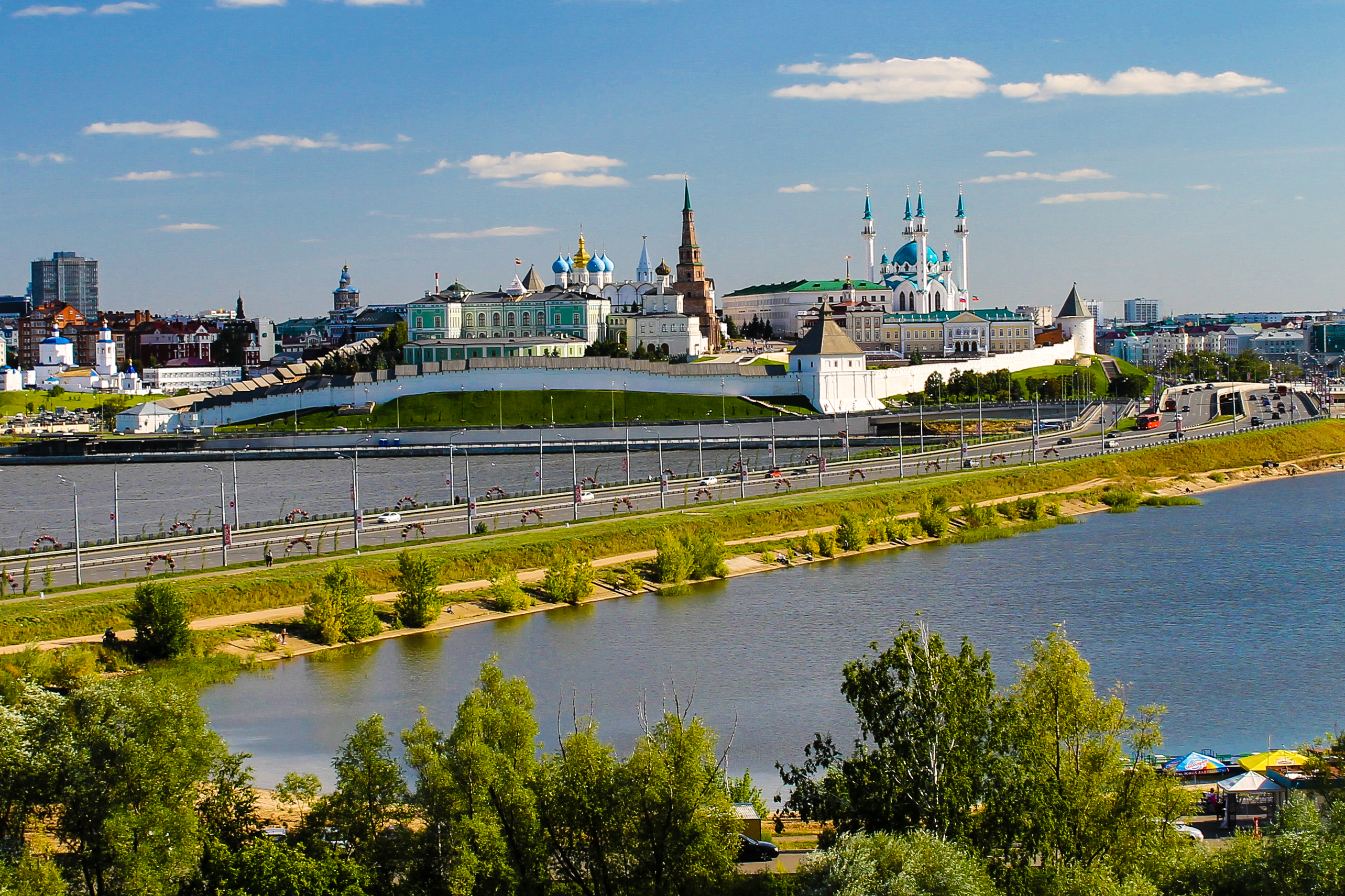
- Kazan Kremlin

- Location within European Russia Location within Europe
- 55°47′57″N 49°06′20″E
- Location: Kazan, Russia

History
- Built: 10th–16th centuries

UNESCO World Heritage Site
- Official name: Historic and Architectural Complex of the Kazan Kremlin
- Type: Cultural
- Criteria: ii, iii, iv
- Designated: 2000 (24th session)
- Reference no.: 980
- Region: Europe and North America

The Kazan Kremlin (Russian: Казанский кремль; Tatar: Казан кирмәне) is the chief historic citadel of Kazan, a city in Russia. It was built at the behest of Ivan the Terrible on the ruins of the former castle of Kazan khans. It was declared a World Heritage Site in 2000.

== History and monuments ==
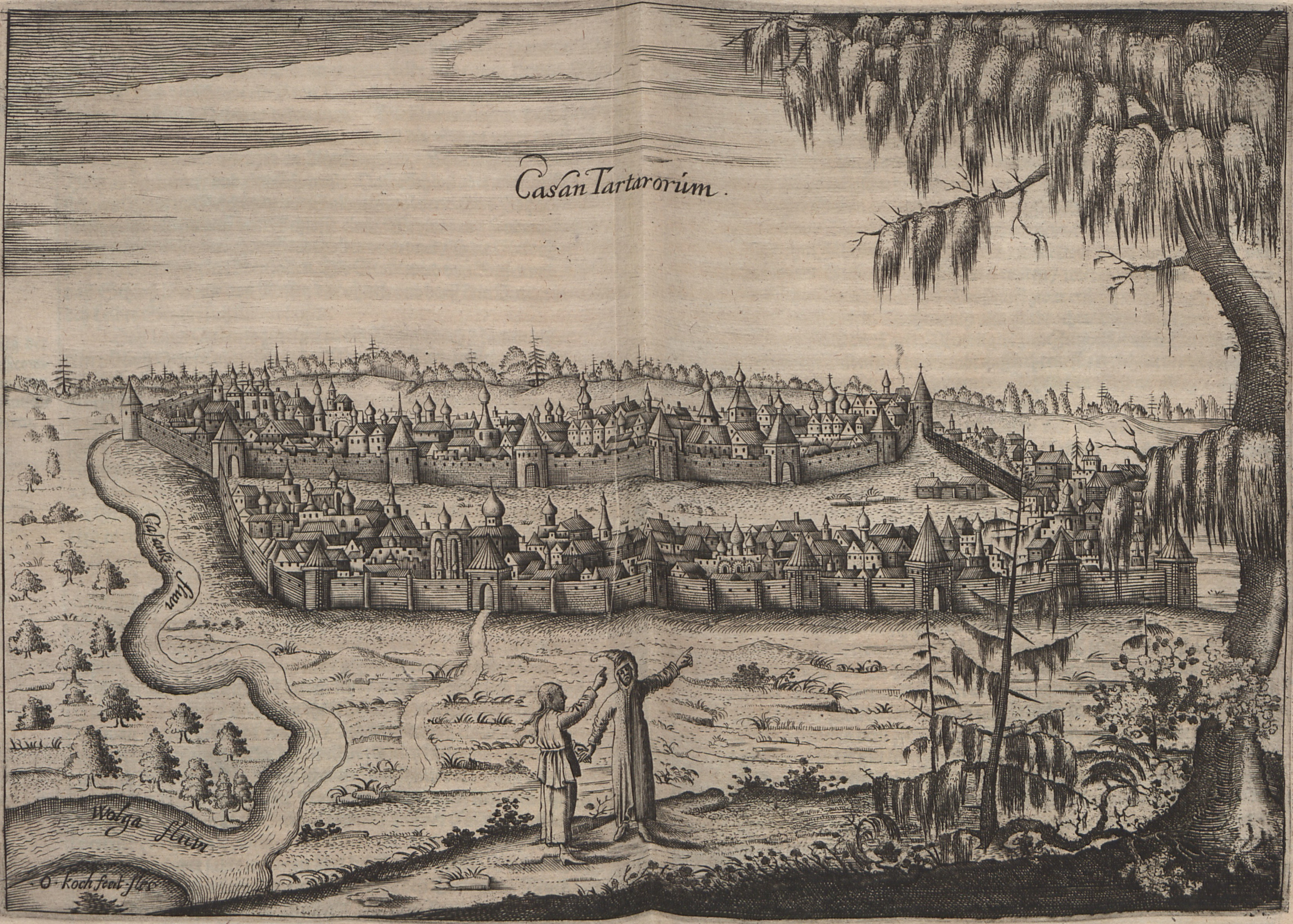
Kazan Kreml' in 1630

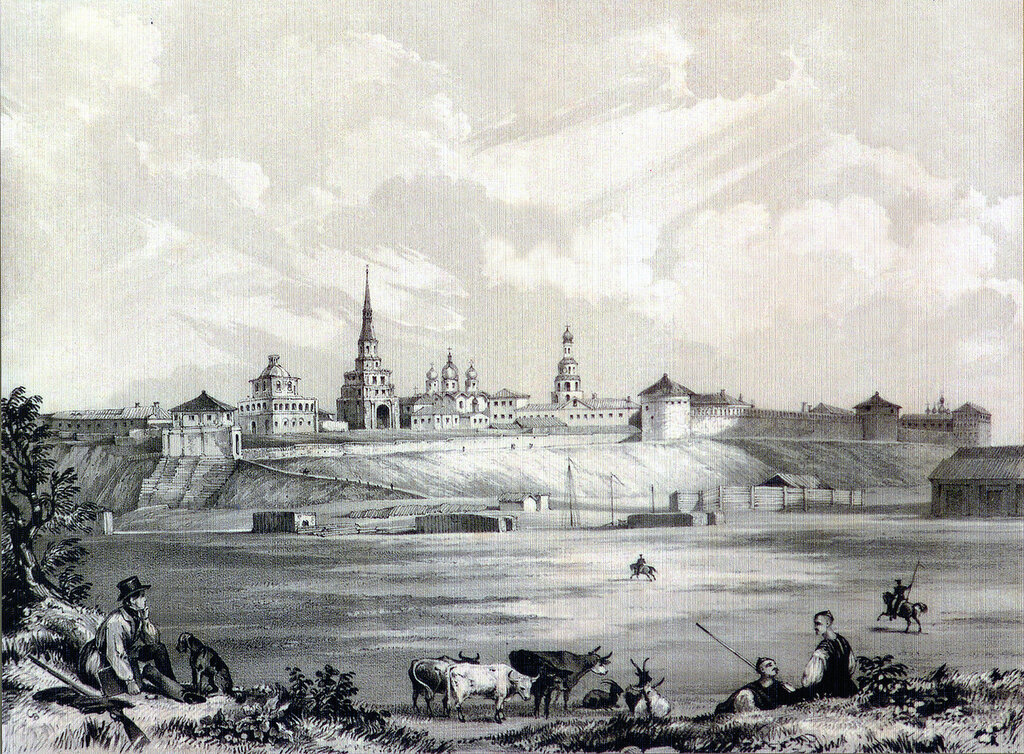
Kazan Kreml' in 1839

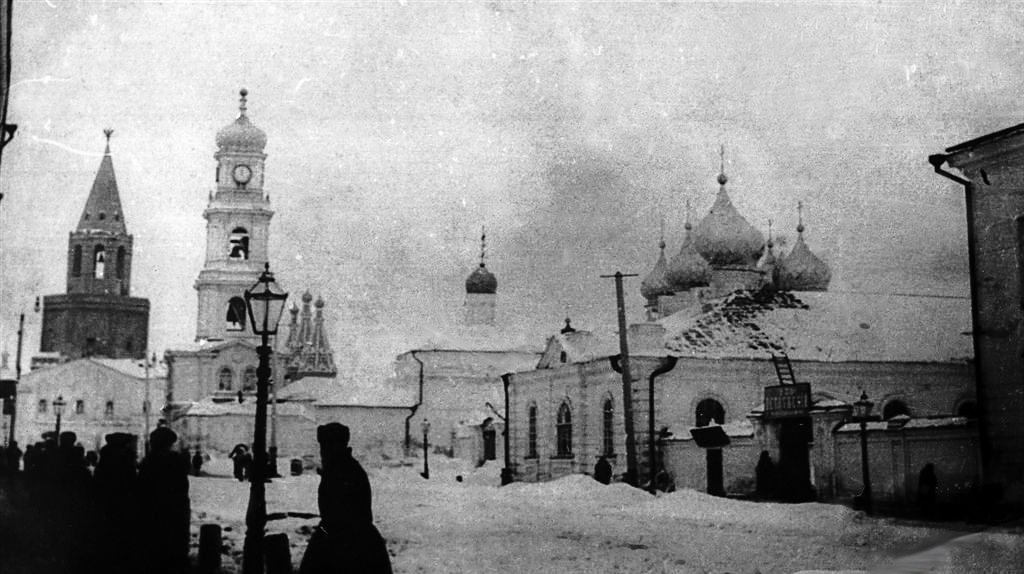
Saviour-Transfiguration monastery in 19th century

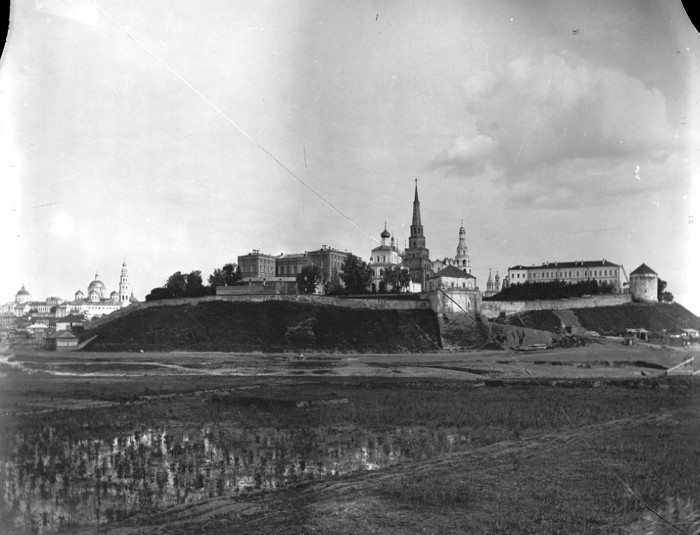
Kazan Kreml' in 1911

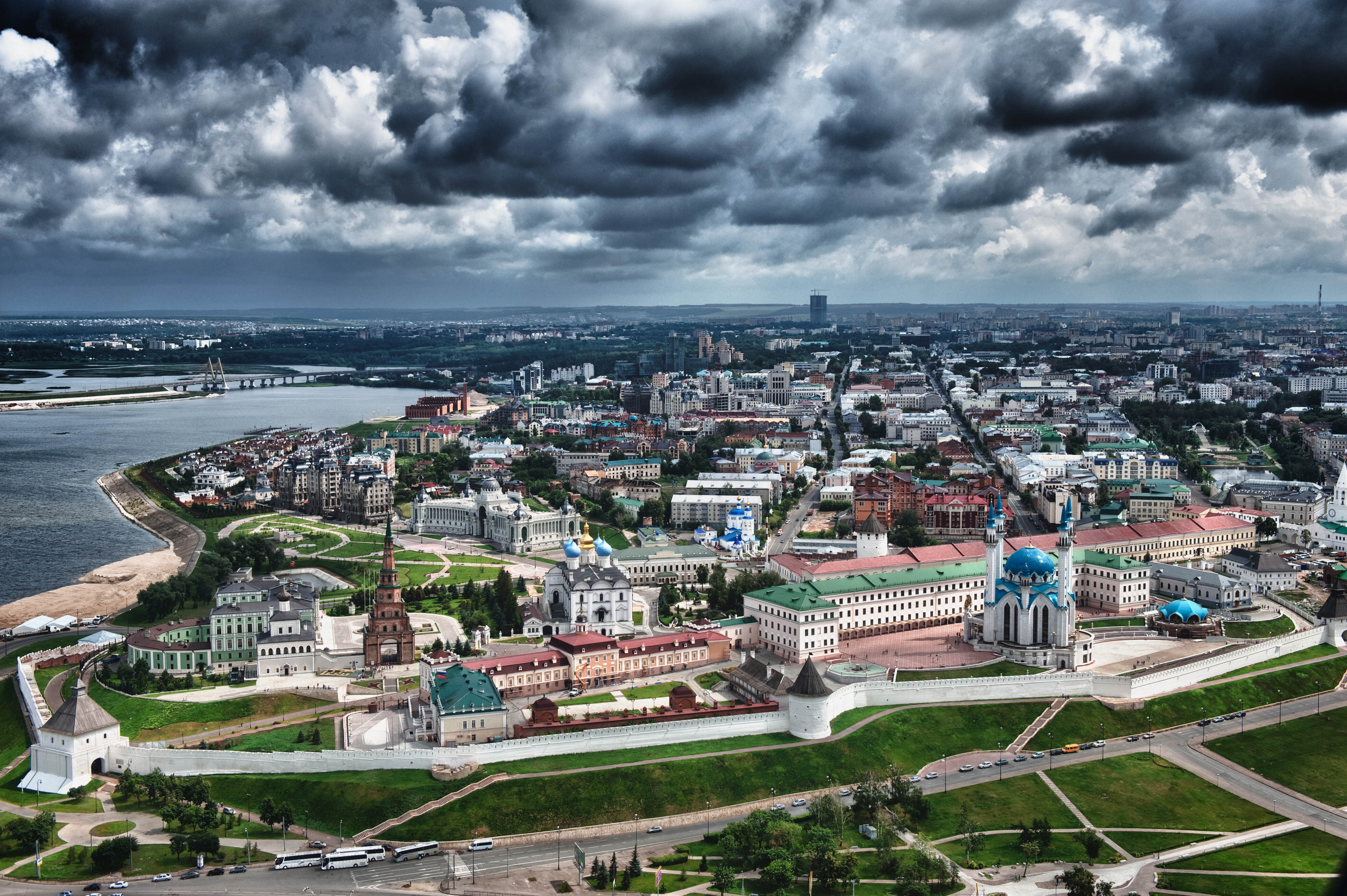
Kremlin from bird's view

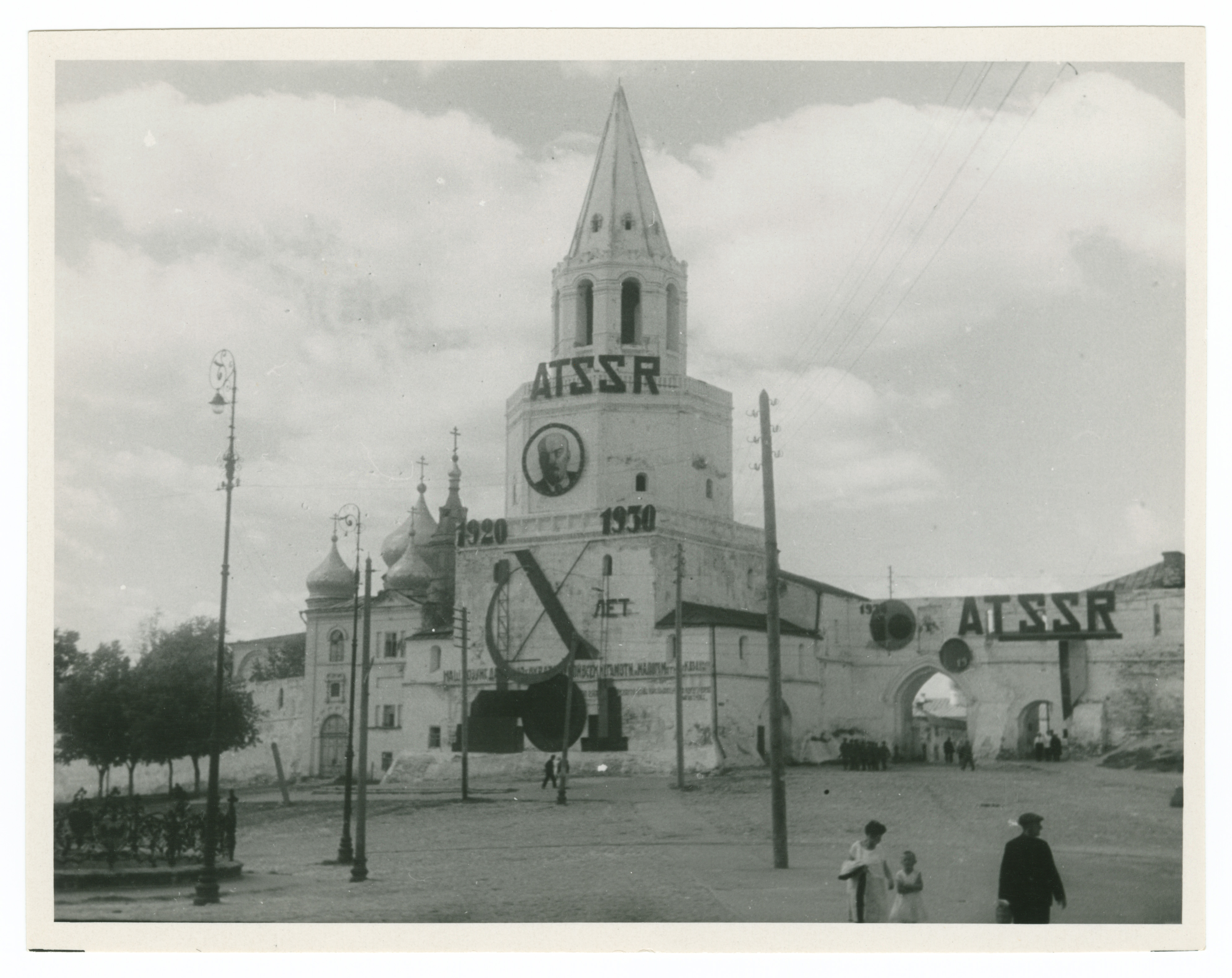
Main entrance with Spasskaya Tower in early 20th century

The Kazan Kremlin includes many old buildings, the oldest of which is the Annunciation Cathedral (1554–1562), the only 16th-century Russian church to have six piers and five apses. Like many of Kazan's buildings of the period, it is constructed of local pale sandstone rather than of brick. The renowned Pskov architects Postnik Yakovlev and Ivan Shirjay (called Barma) were invited by the Tsar to rebuild the Kazan Kremlin in stone. The cathedral bell tower was erected in five tiers at the urging of Ivan the Terrible and was scored to resemble the Ivan the Great Belltower in Moscow, but was pulled down by the Soviets in 1930.

The most conspicuous landmark of the Kazan Kremlin is the leaning Söyembikä Tower, which probably goes back to the reign of Peter the Great. A well-known legend connects the tower with the last queen of the Khanate of Kazan. Another recognizable architectural feature is the Spasskaya Tower, which anchors the southern end of the Kremlin and serves as the main entrance to the Kremlin.

The Spasskaya Tower is named after the Spassky Monastery, which used to be located nearby. Among the monastery's buildings were the Church of St. Nicholas (1560s, four piers) and the Cathedral of the Saviour's Transfiguration (1590s, six piers). They were destroyed by the Communists during Joseph Stalin's rule.

Also of interest are snow-white towers and walls, erected in the 16th and 17th centuries but later renovated; the Kul Sharif Mosque, recently rebuilt inside the citadel; and the Governor's House (1843–1853), designed by Konstantin Thon, now the Palace of the President of the Republic of Tatarstan. The Palace is believed to be located on the site of a former Khan's palace. Tucked between Presidential Palace and Söyembikä Tower is the palace church built on the foundation of a medieval mosque.

The Northern wall of the Kremlin contains another gated tower, Secret Tower, so named because it used to house a secret water supply well. This tower allows pedestrian access to the Kremlin, but vehicle access is restricted to emergencies only.

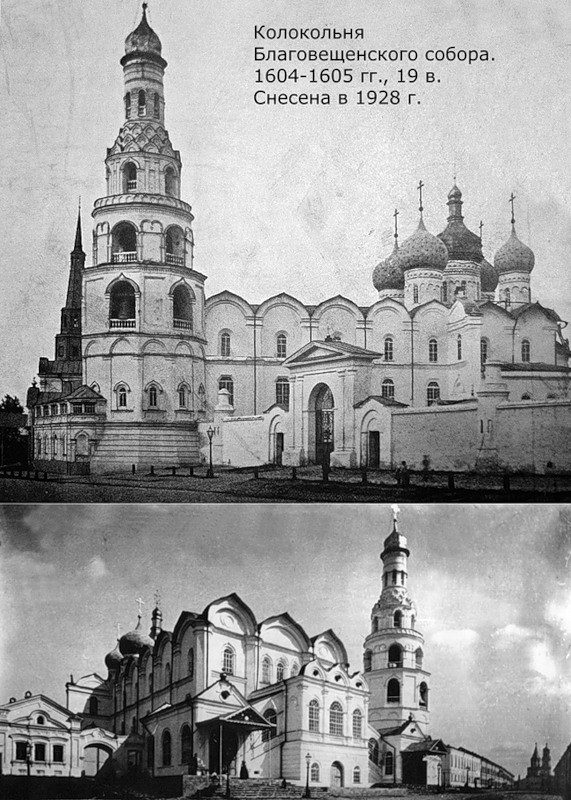

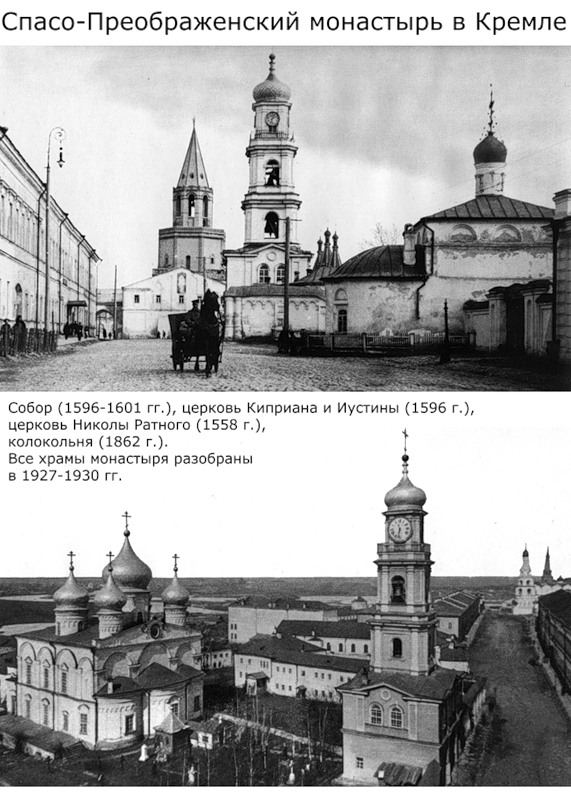

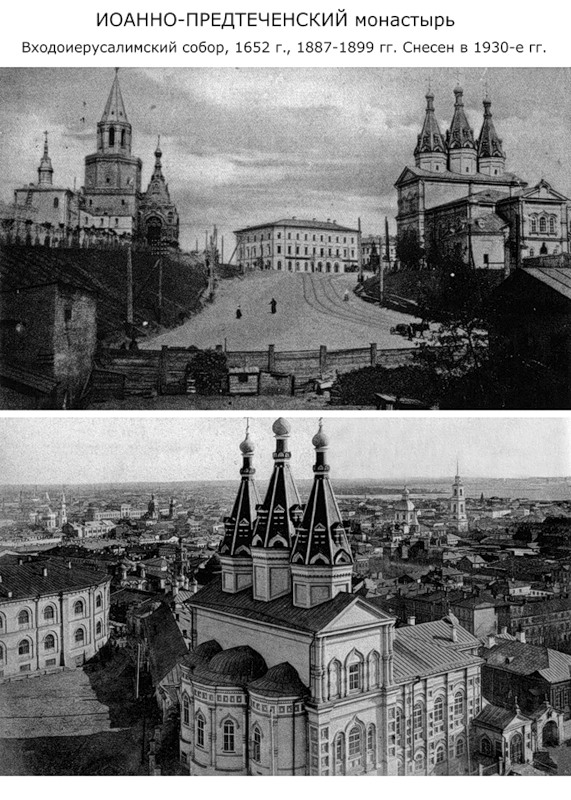

=== 21st century ===
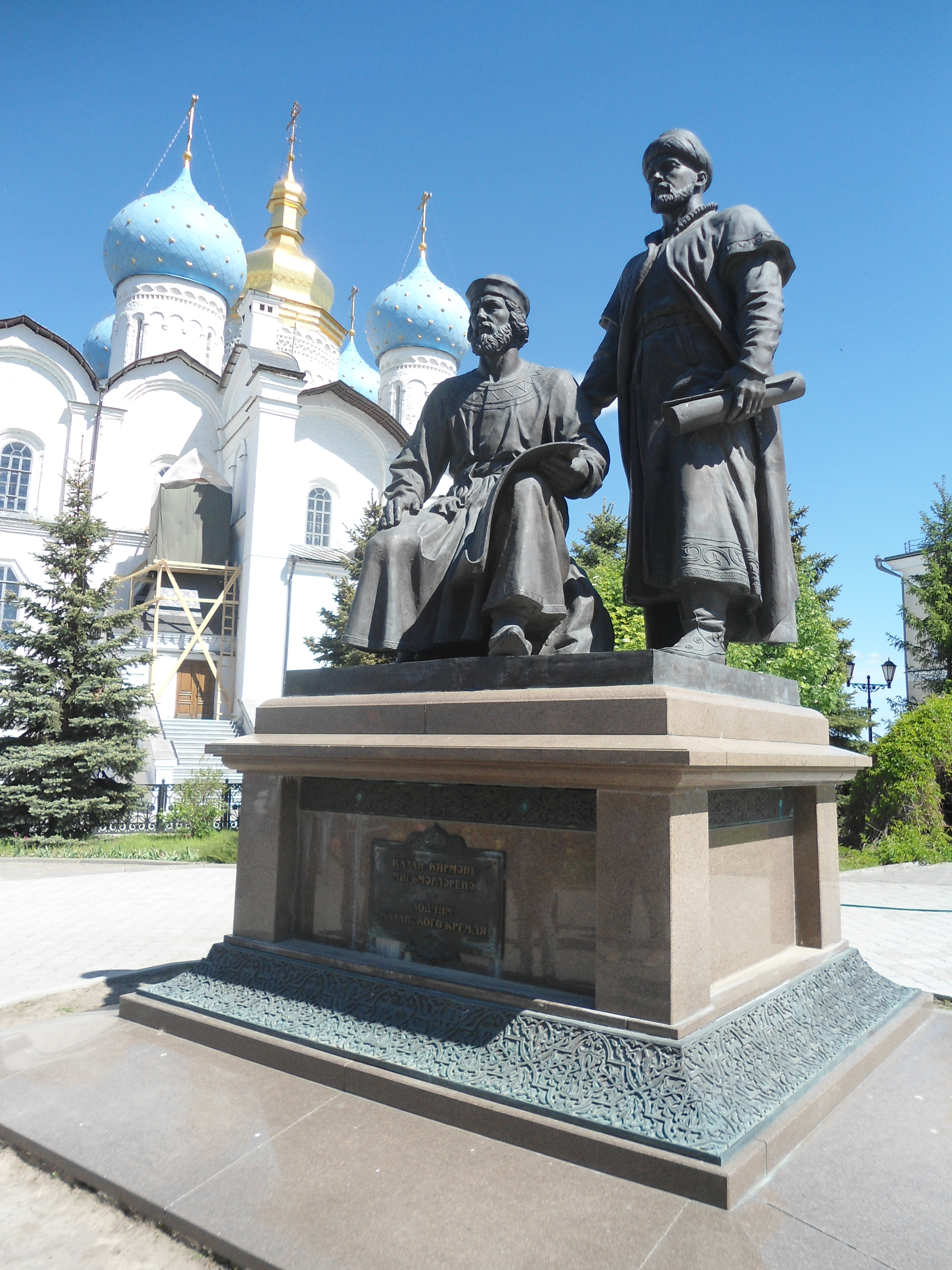
Monument to Tatar and Russian builders

The opening of one of the biggest mosques in Europe, the Kul Sharif, was held in Kazan on June 24, 2005. Roughly 17,000 people gathered for the celebration. Delegations from forty countries attended the event. The facility was reconstructed on the site where the Kazan Khanate's principal mosque had presumably been standing before 1552. Speaking at the ceremony, Tatarstan President Mintimer Shaeymiev said "the Qolşärif mosque is a new symbol of Kazan and Tatarstan... a bridge connecting... our past and future."

The decree on restoring the Kul Sharif mosque (1995) also ordered the restoration of the Annunciation Cathedral in the Kazan Kremlin which had been taken away from Orthodox Christians after the Russian Revolution. On July 21, 2005, the feast day of the holy icon "Theotokos of Kazan", in the presence of the crowd of 10,000 pilgrims, Patriarch Alexius II and Mintimer Shaeymiev placed at the newly restored Annunciation Cathedral the holiest copy of the long-lost icon, which had been returned to Russia in 2004 by Pope John Paul II shortly before his death.

In 2005 the first stage of the Kazan Metro also included a station named Kremlyovskaya, the exits of which are right next to the Kremlin.

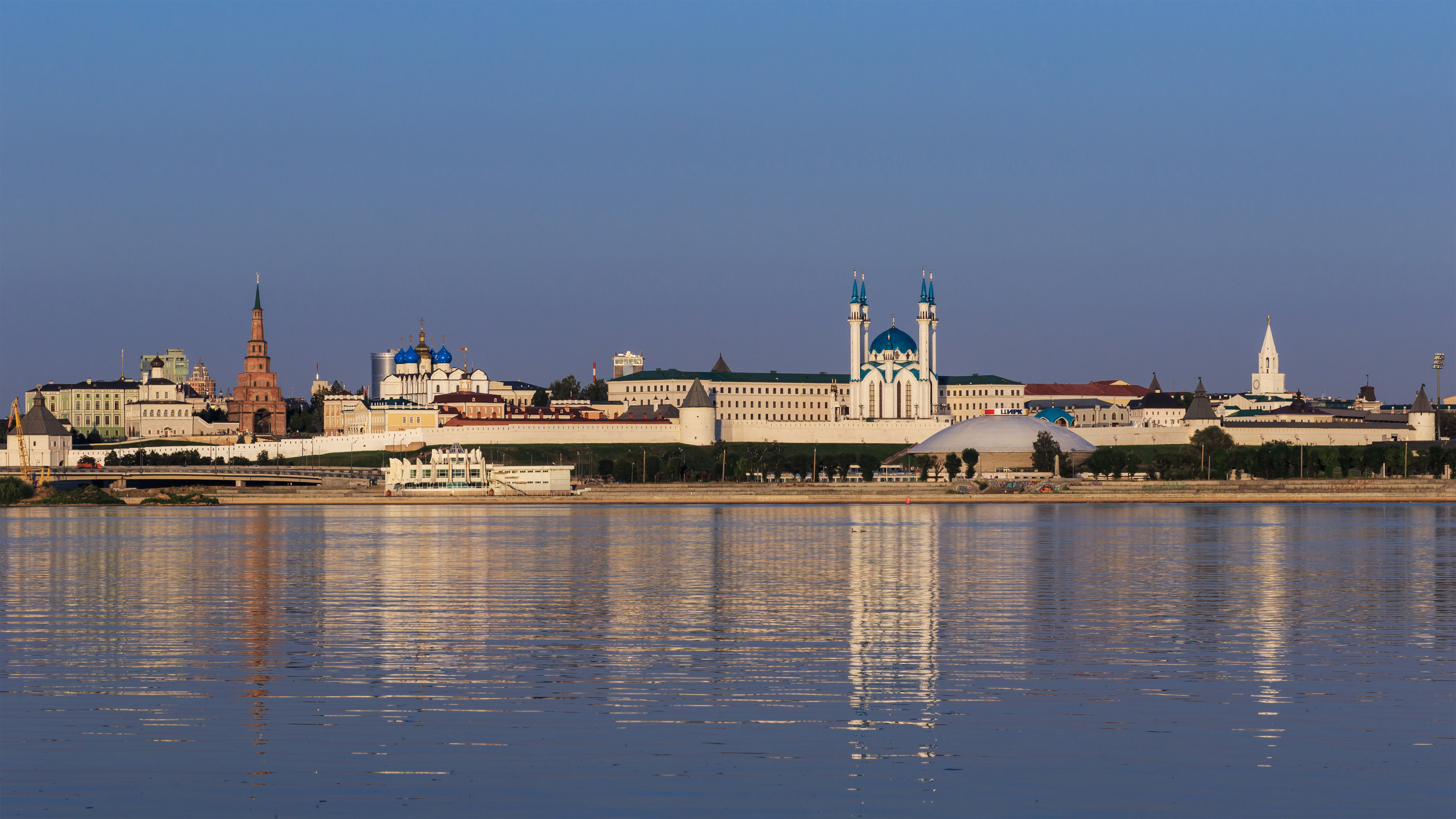
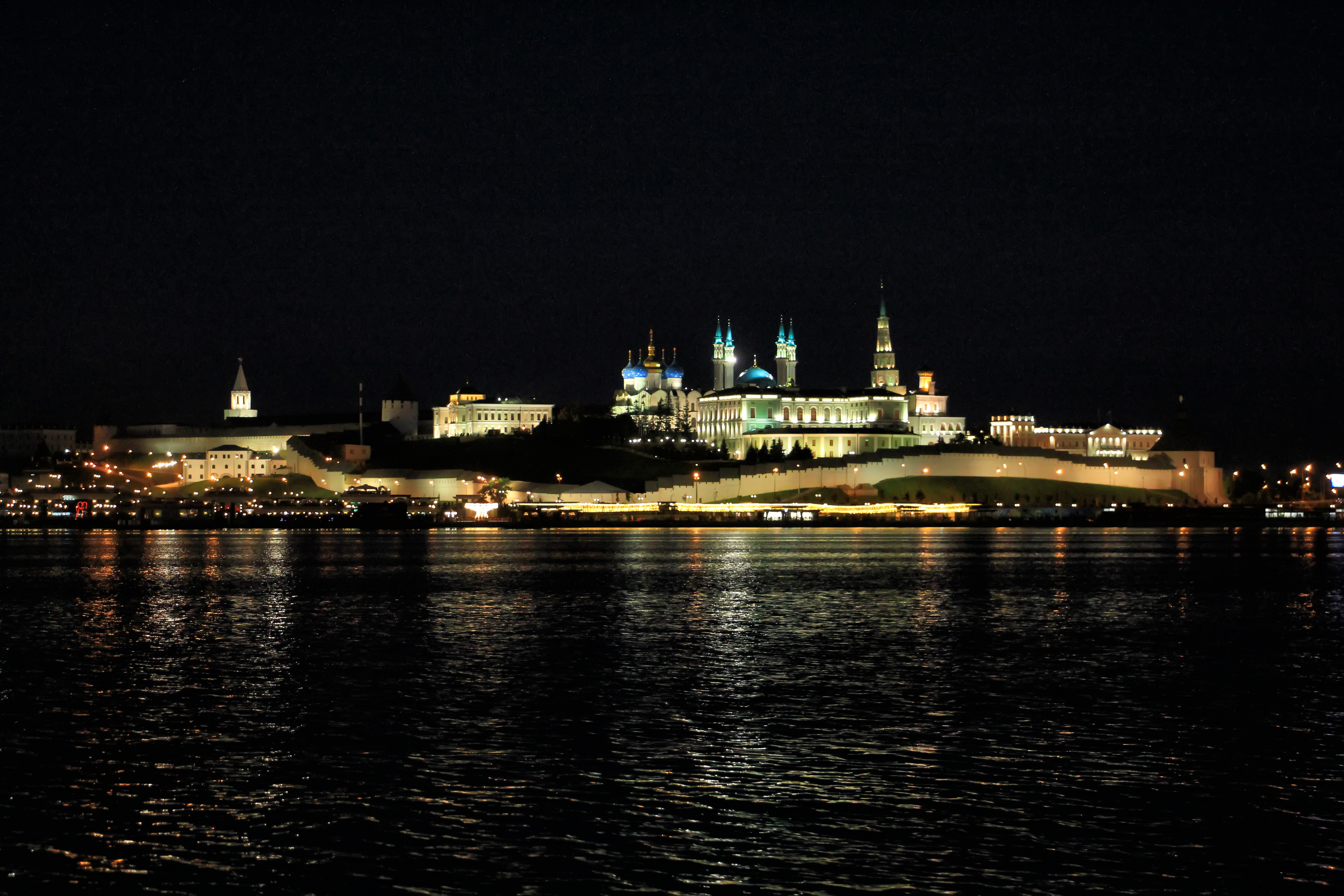

== Buildings ==
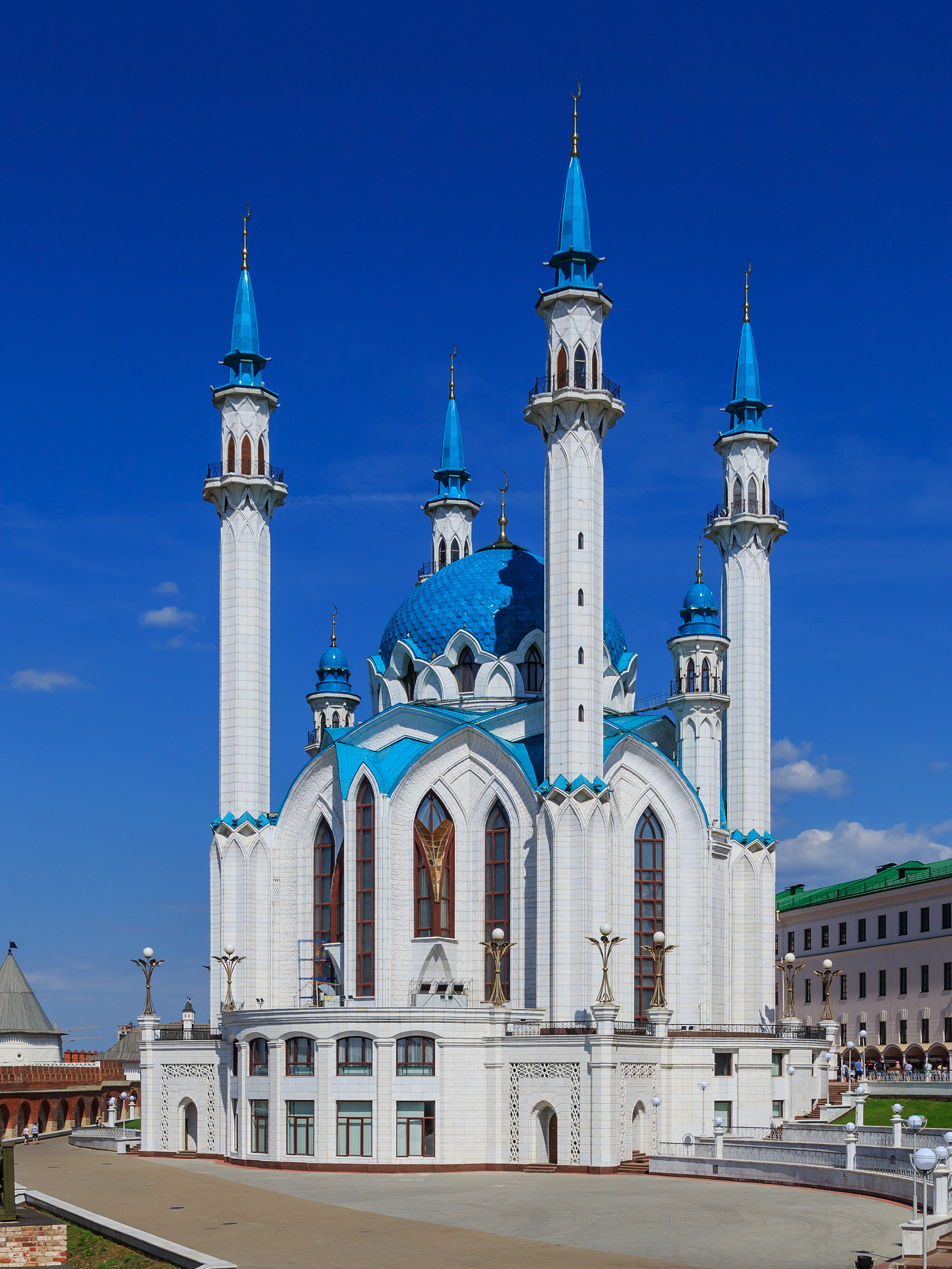
Kul Sharif Mosque

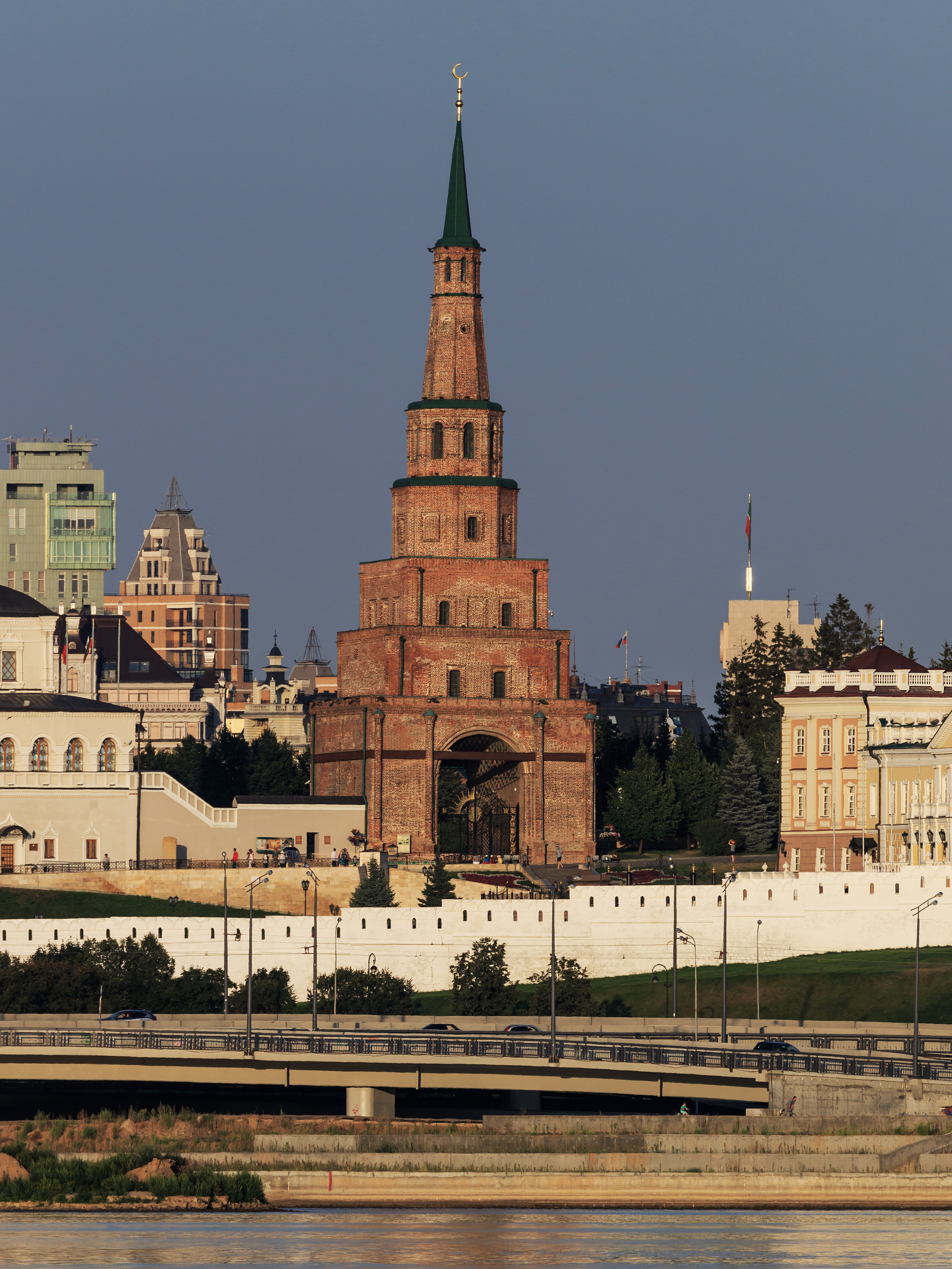
The Söyembikä Tower

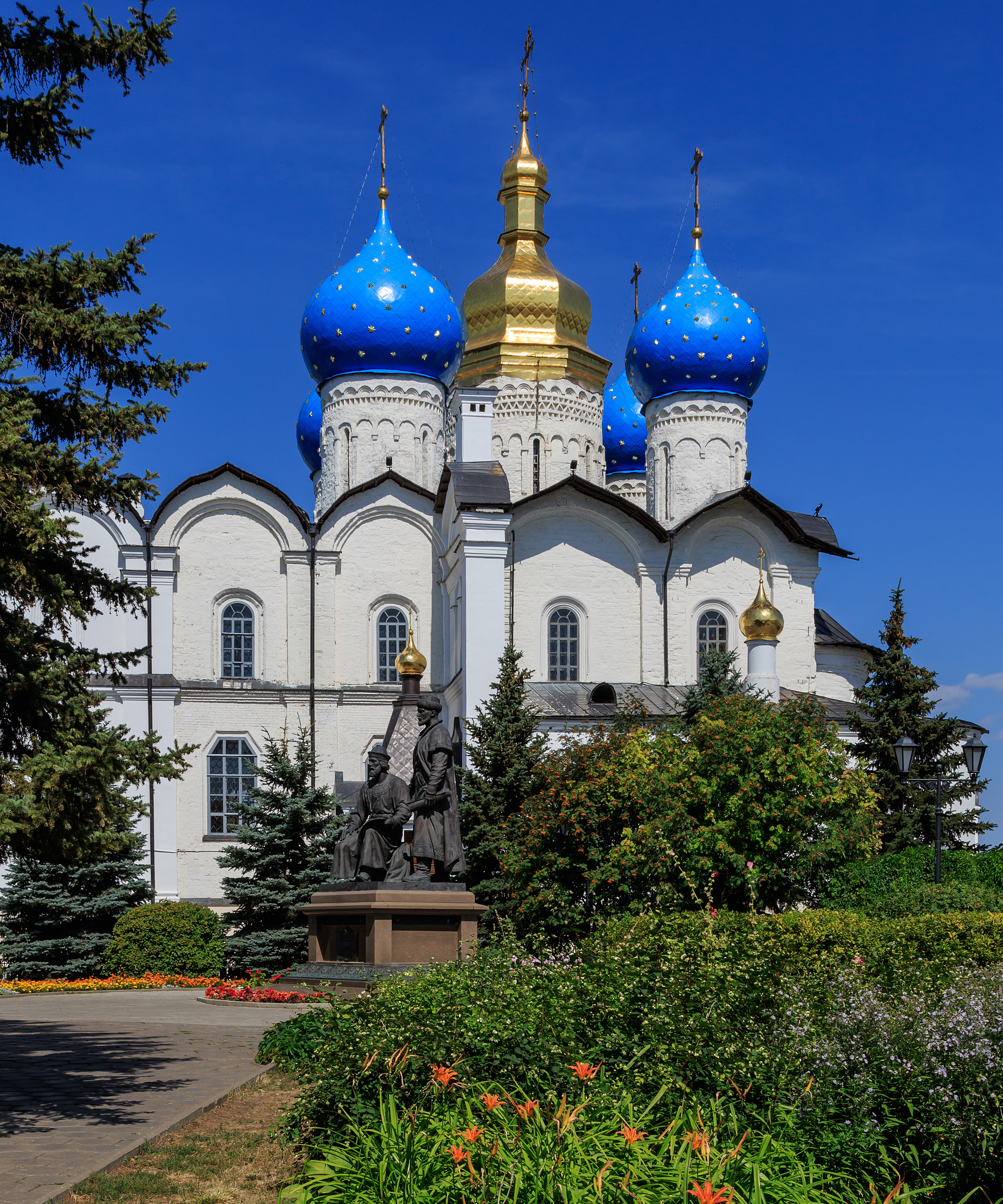
Annunciation Cathedral

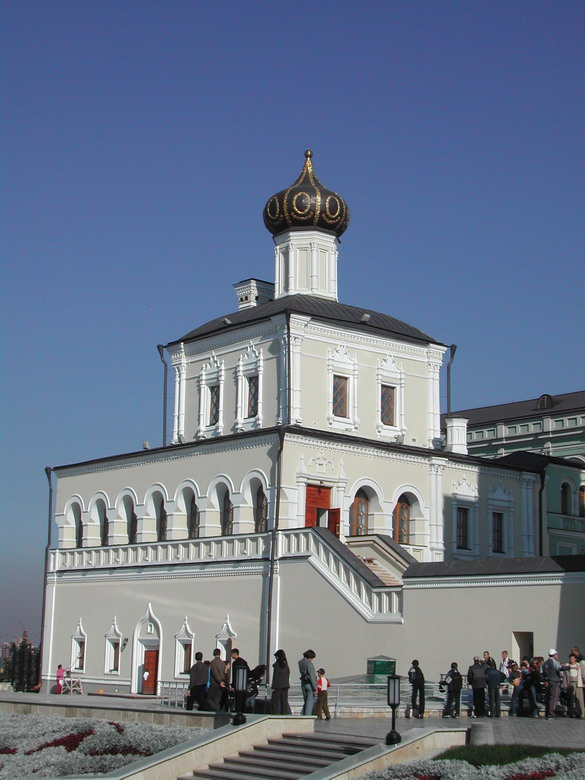
House church
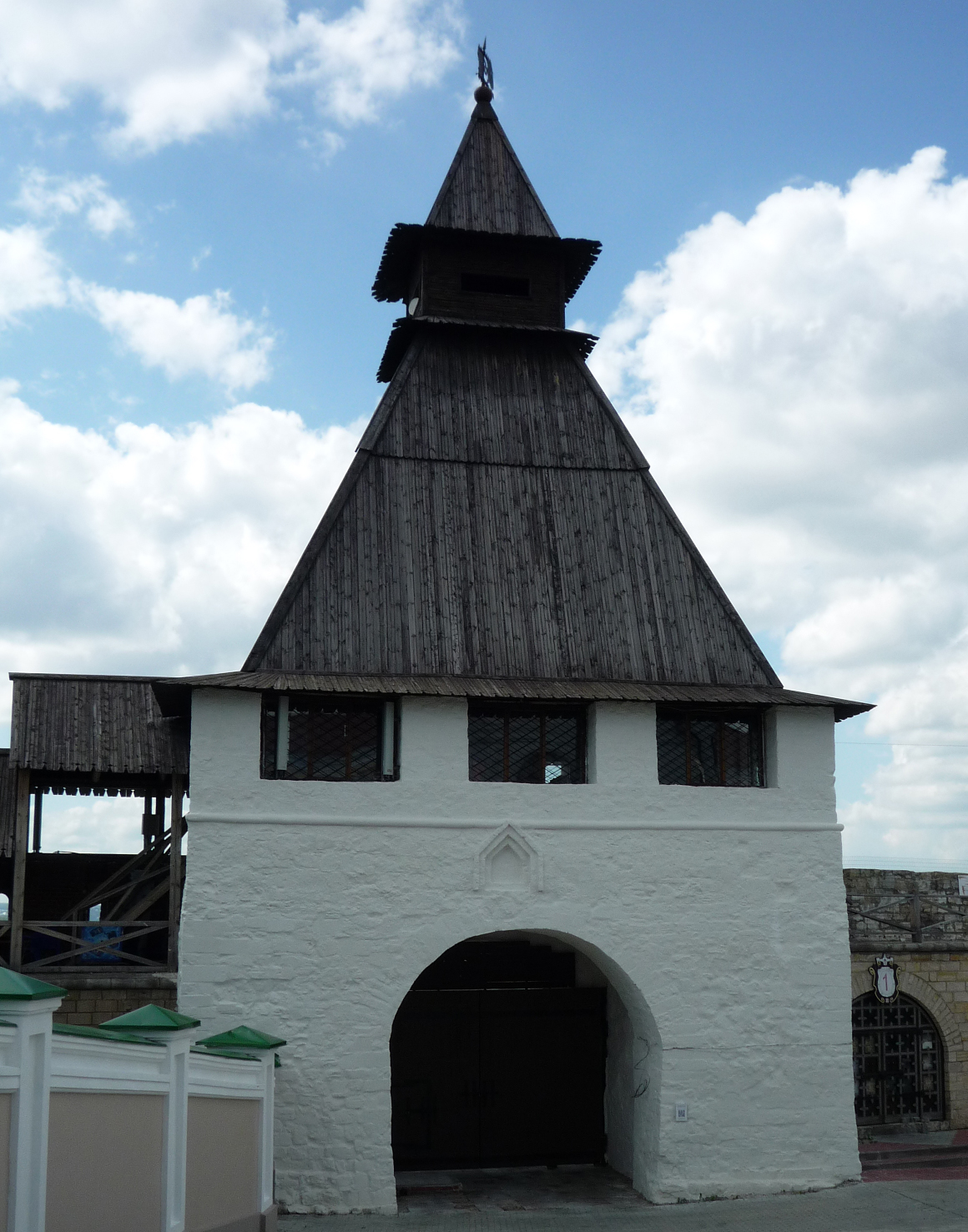
The Transfiguration tower

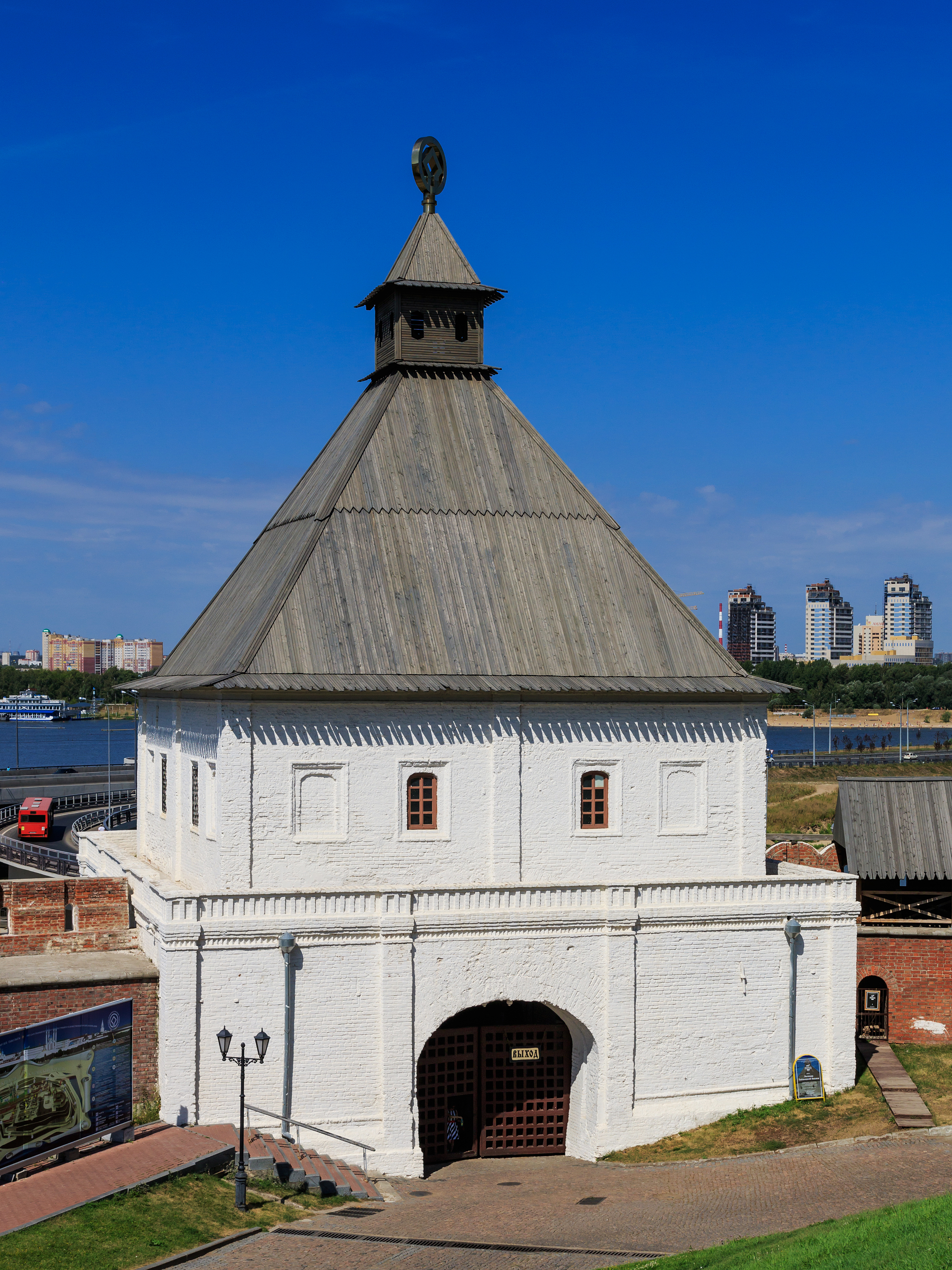
The Taynitskaya tower

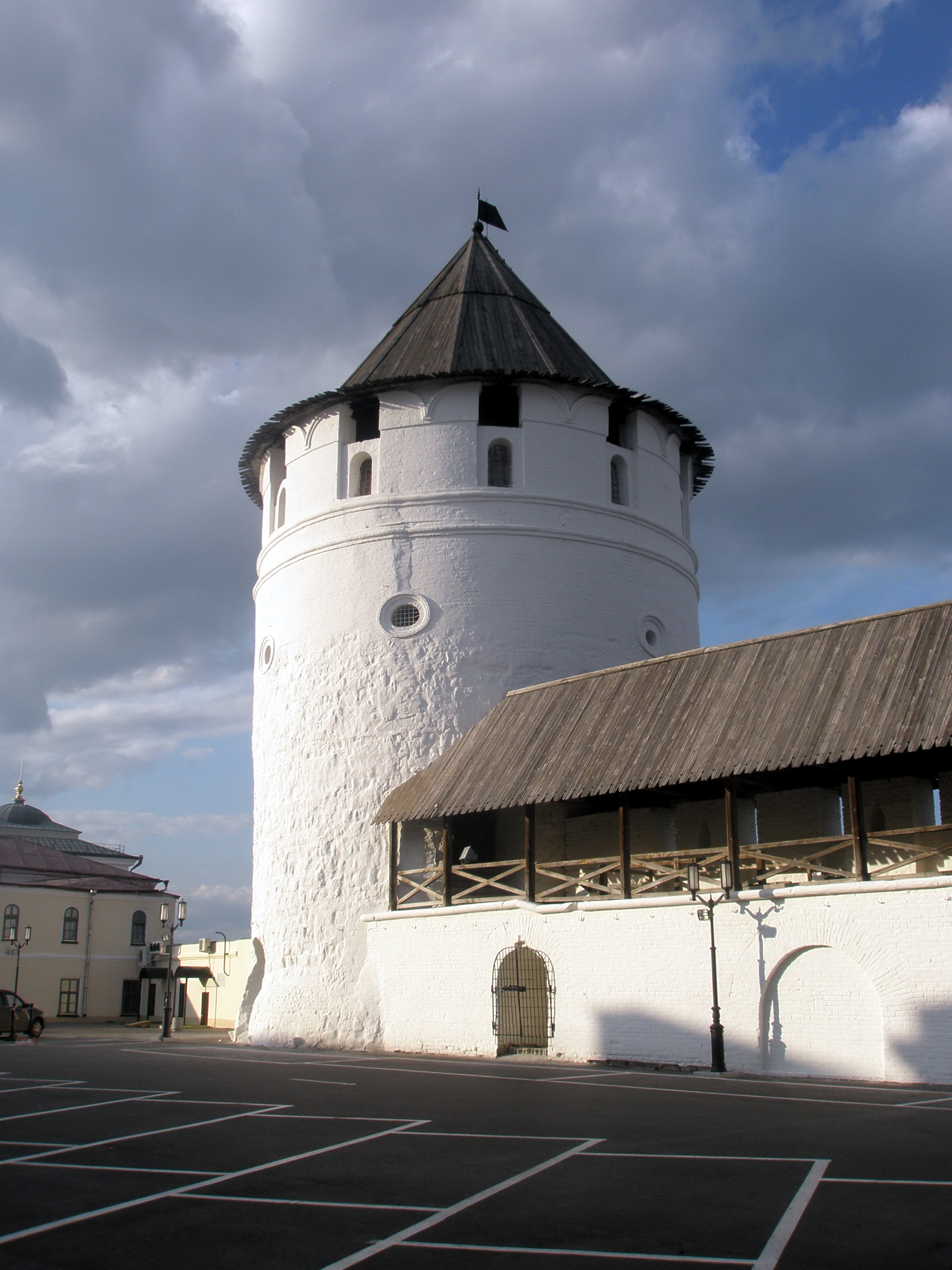
The Consistory tower

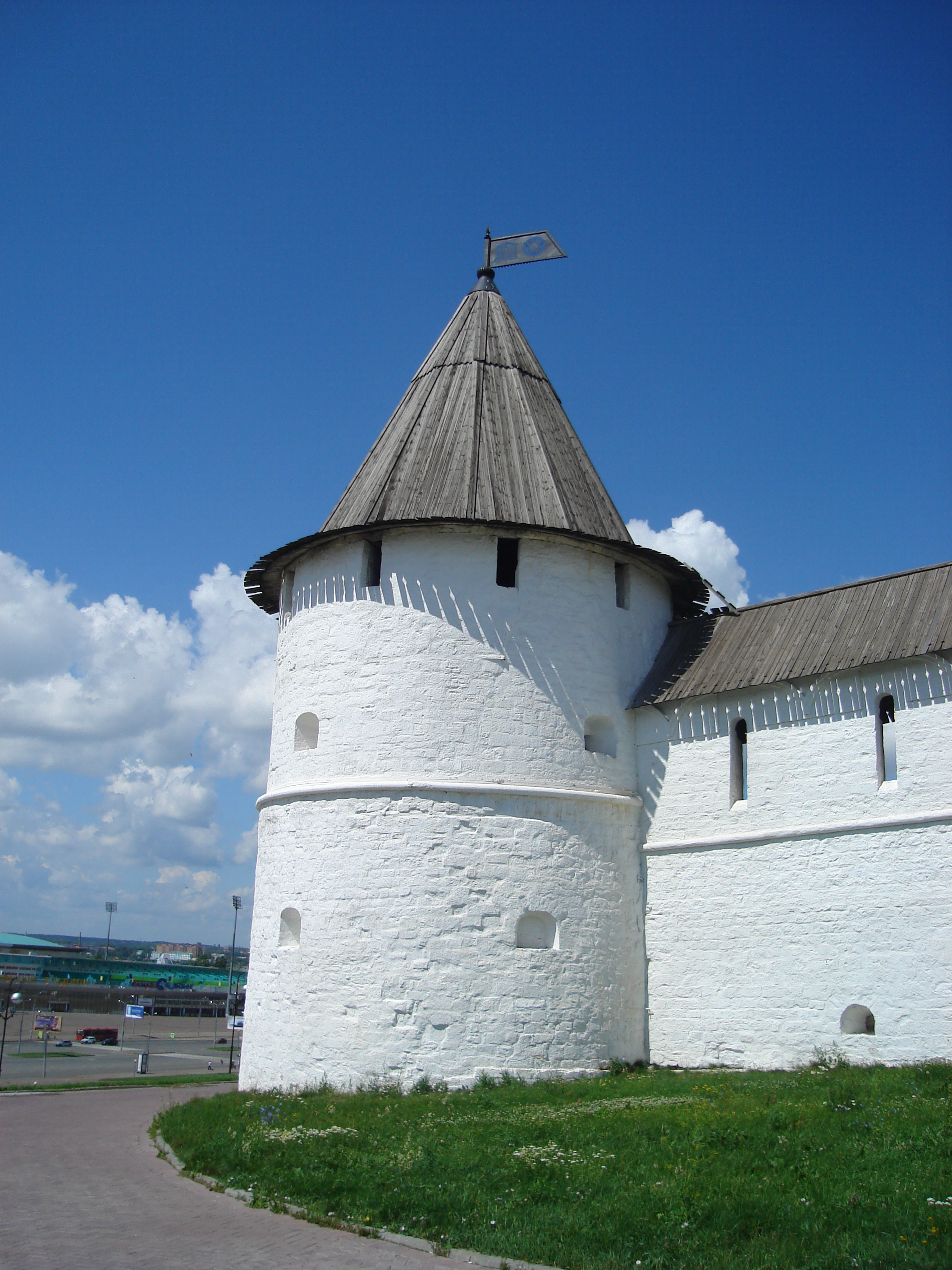
The south-western tower

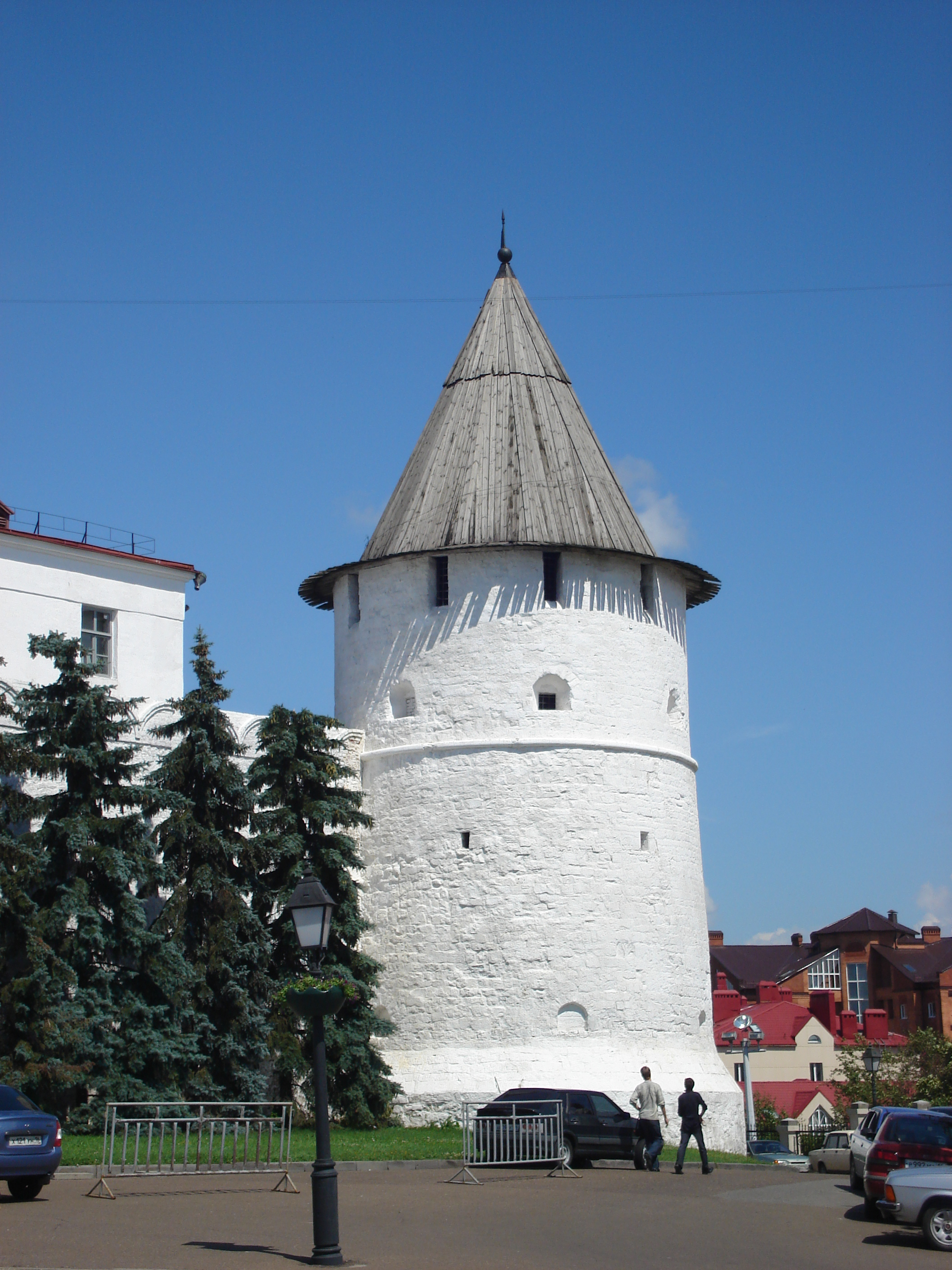
The south-eastern tower
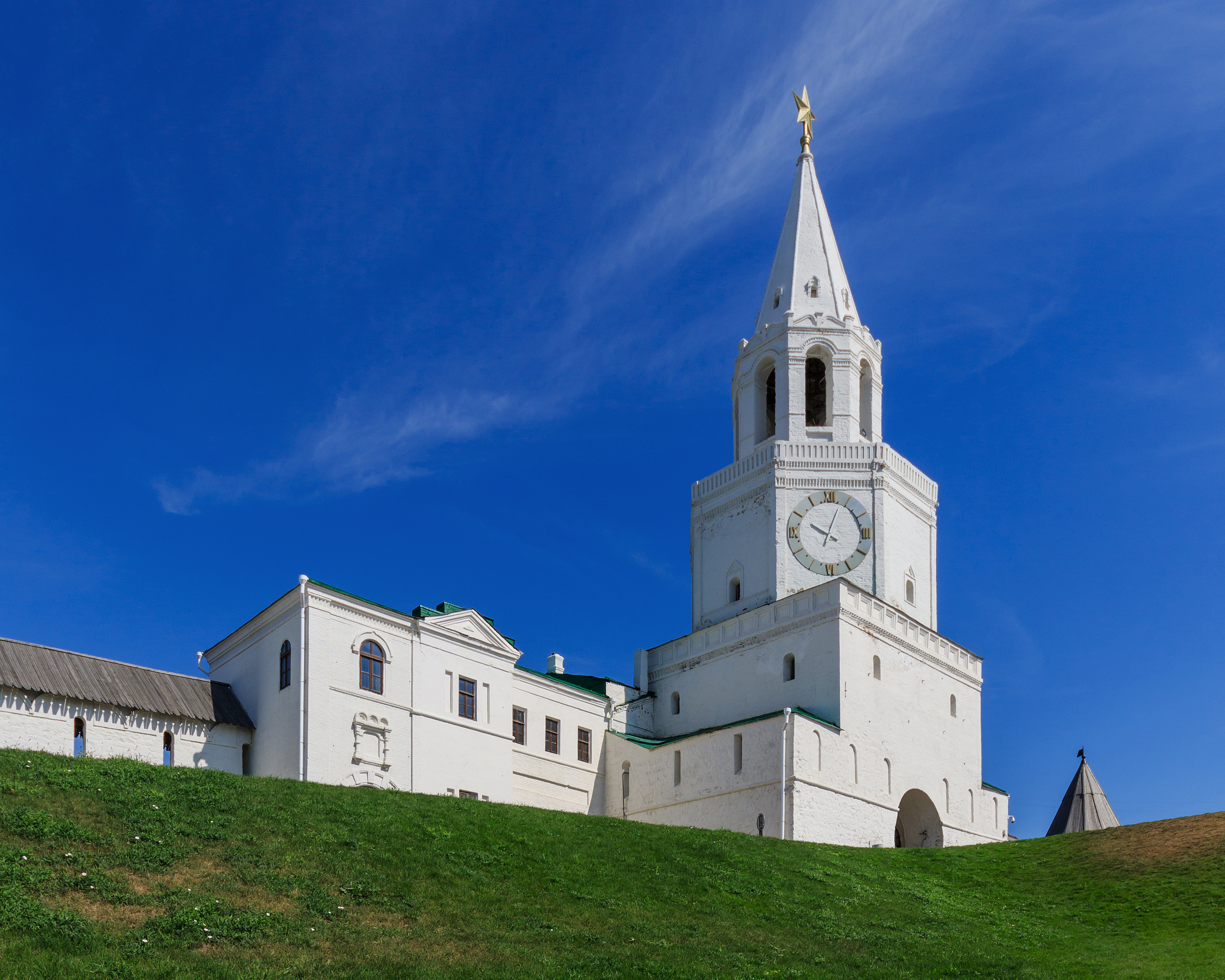
Spasskaya Tower

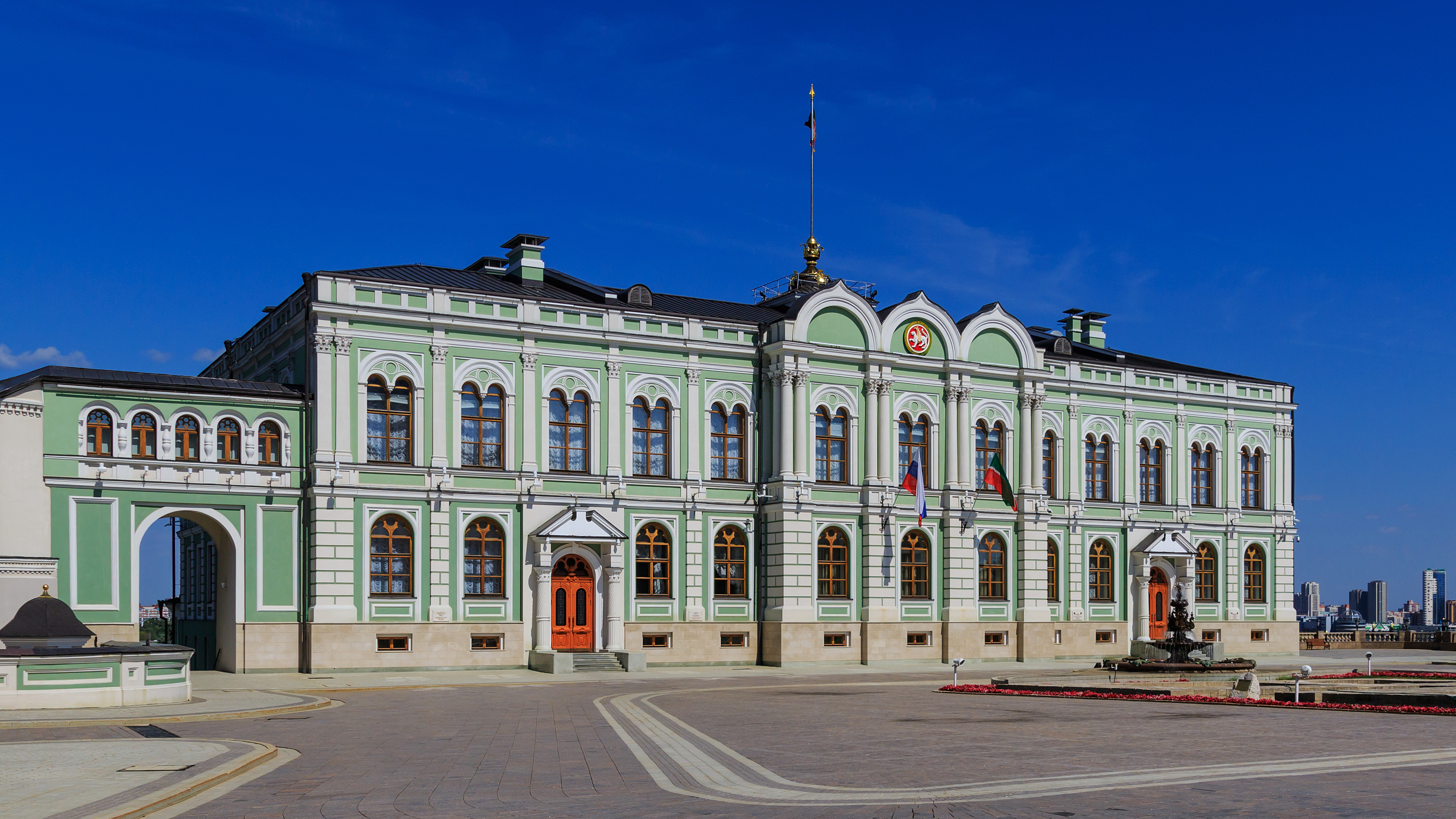
The governor's palace

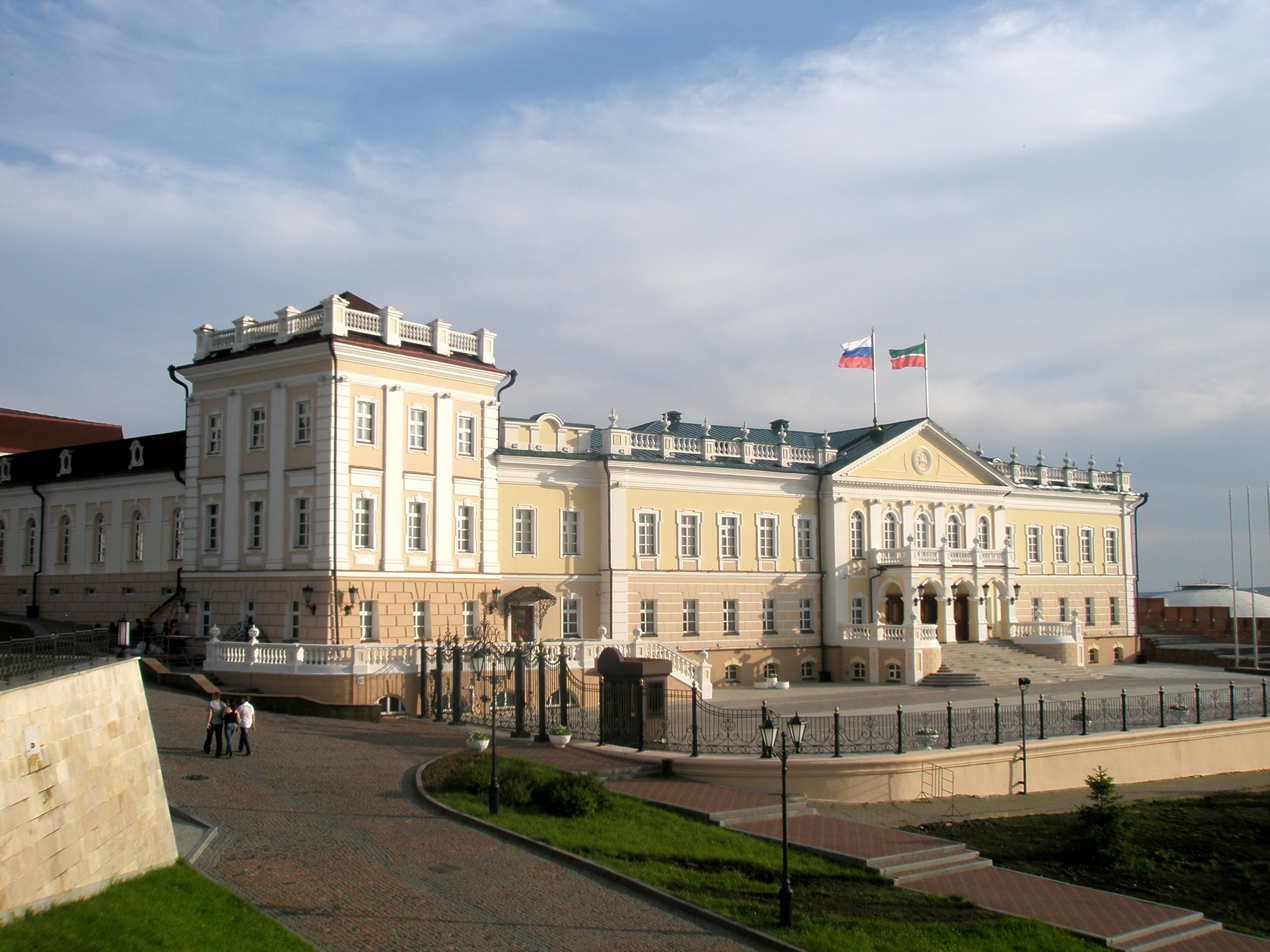
Consistory Palace (the northern housing of the Artillery Court)

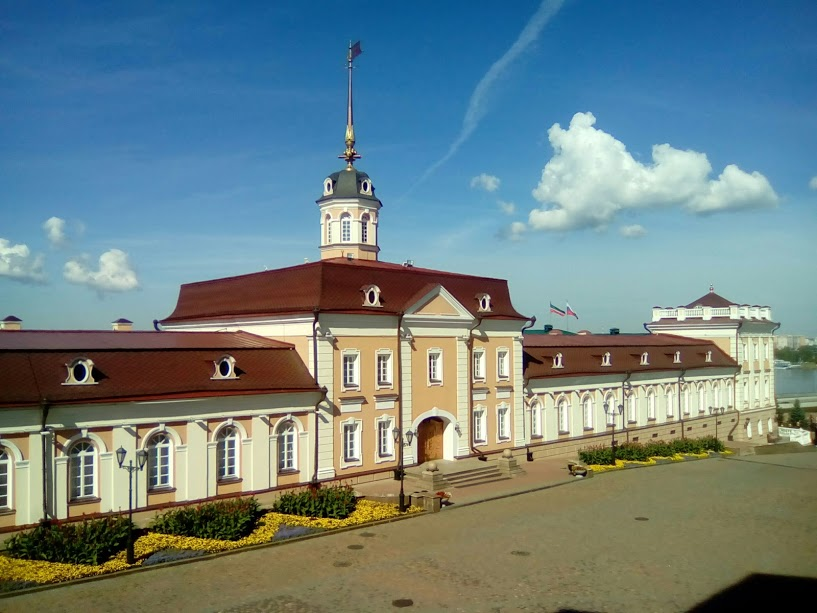
The main housing of the Artillery Court

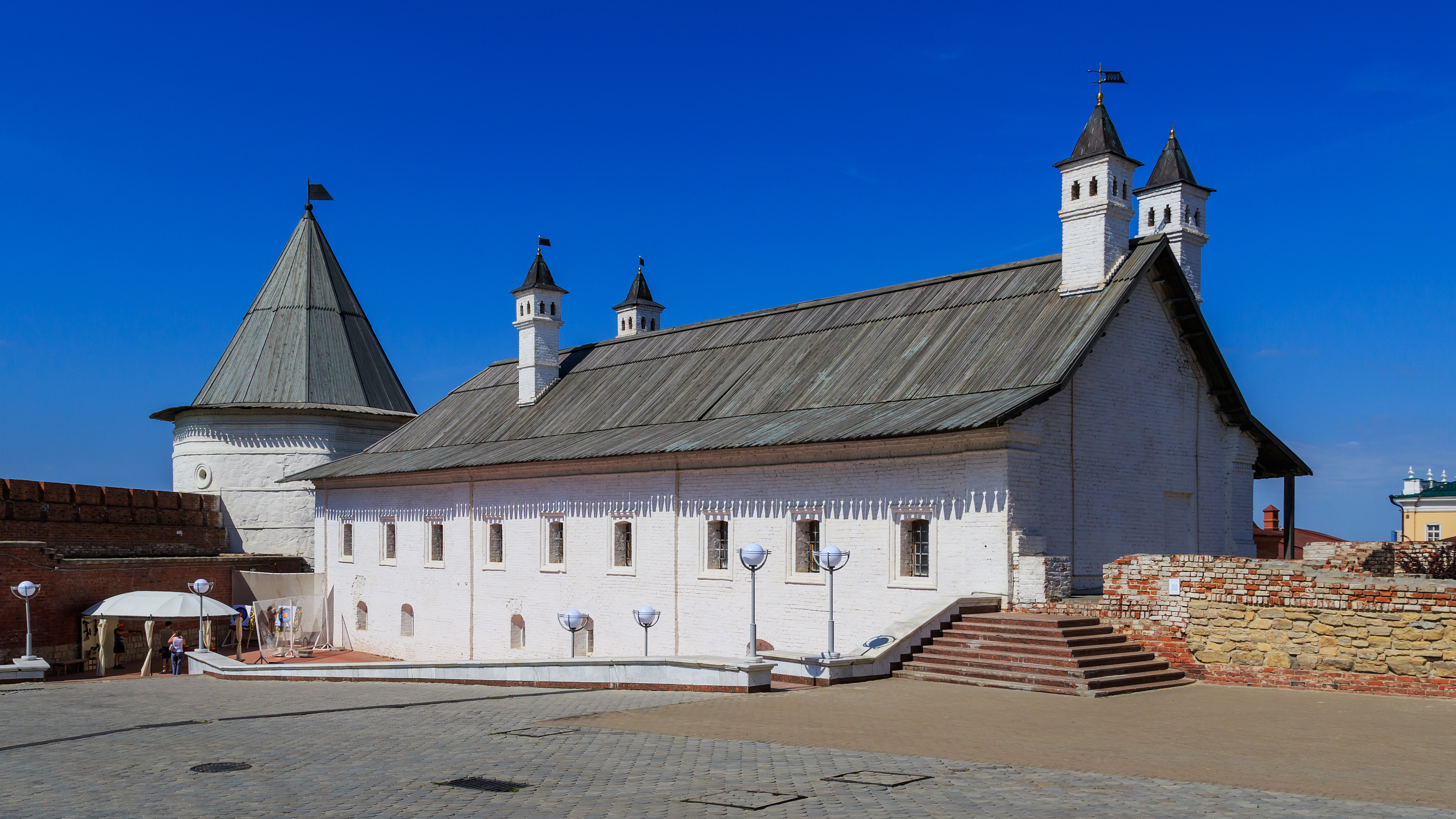
The southern housing of the Artillery Court

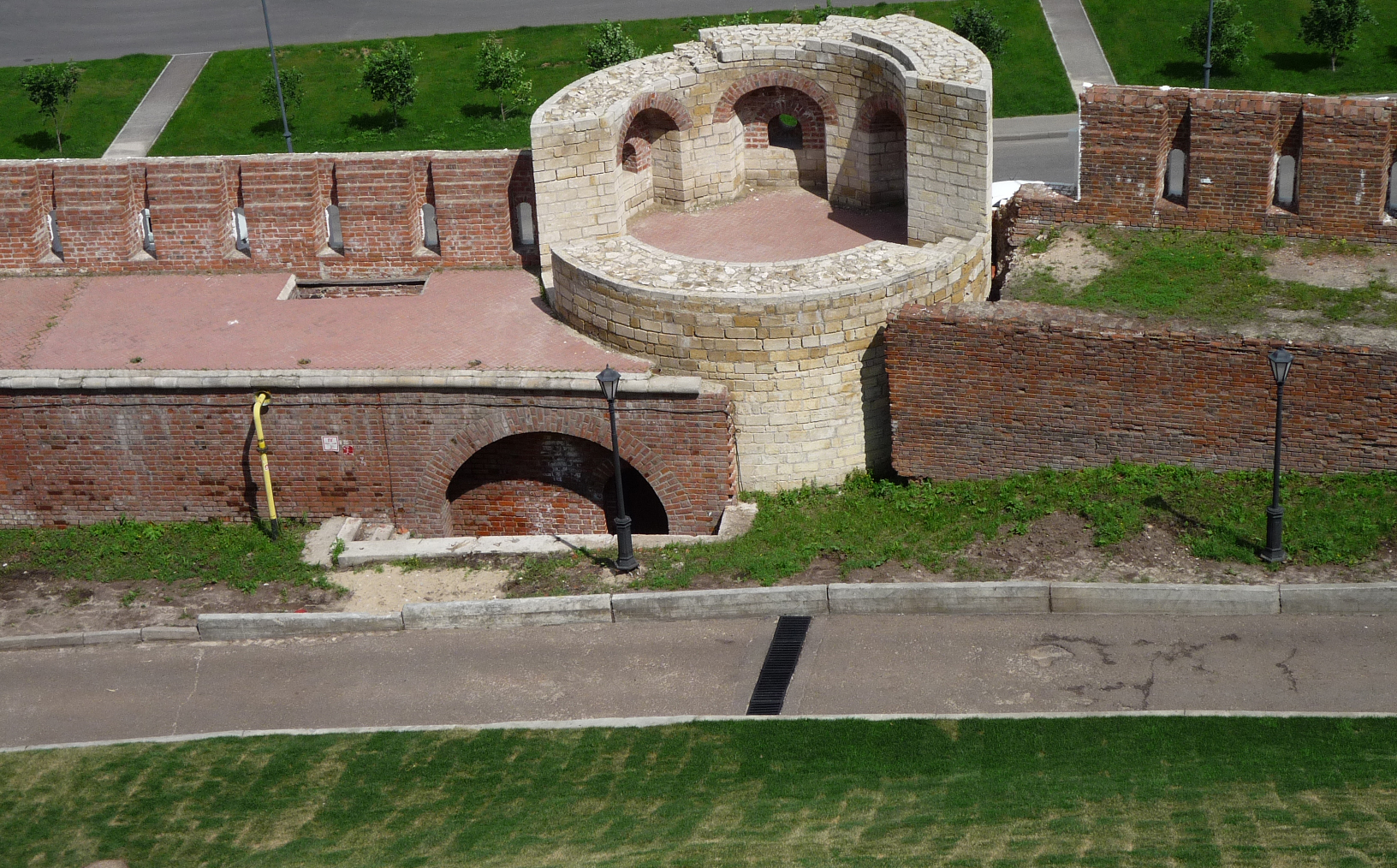
The eastern wall of the Kazan Kremlin

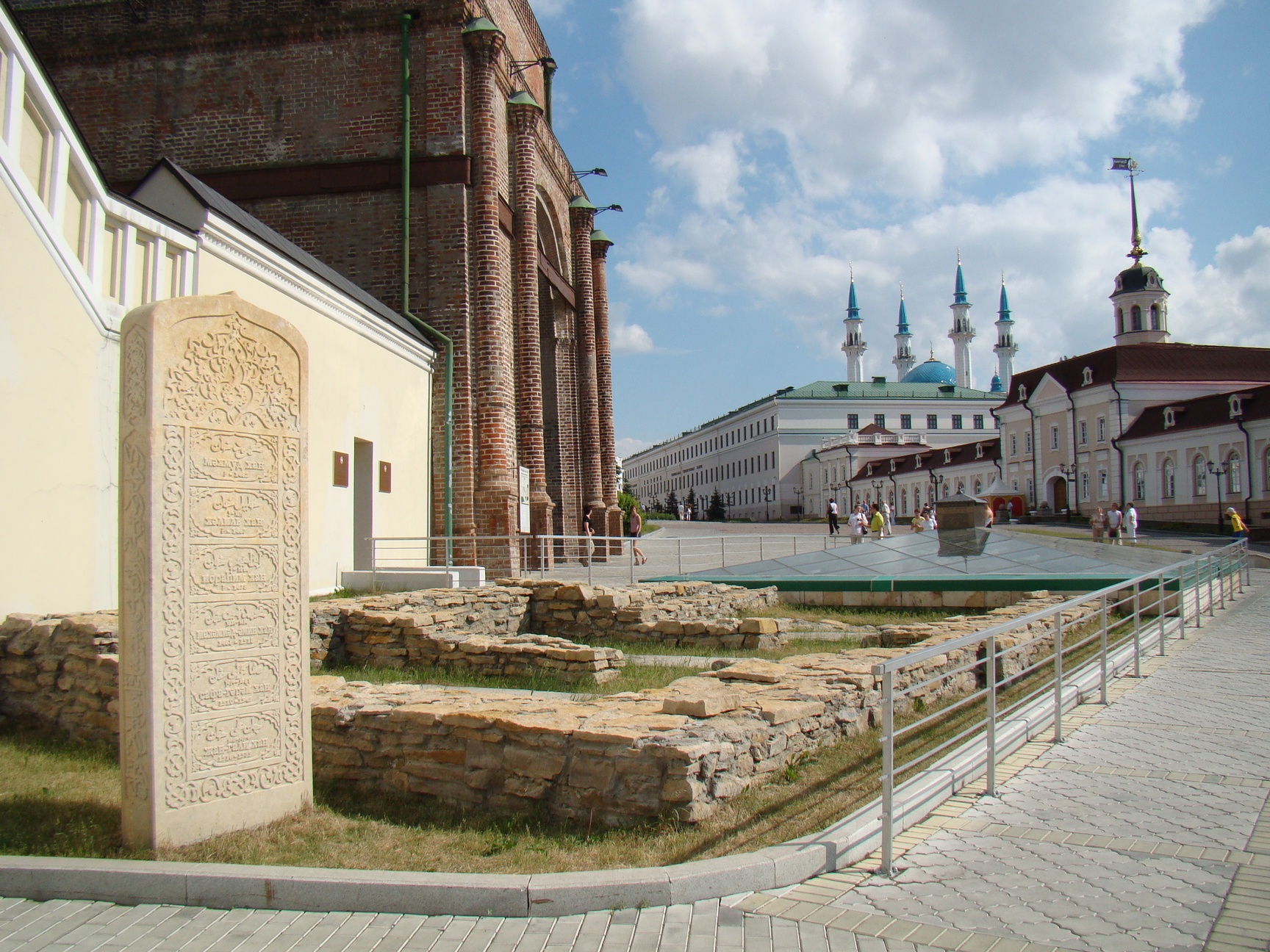
Ruins of Khan's mausoleum
