= Aviastroitelnaya (Kazan Metro) =

Kazan Metro Station

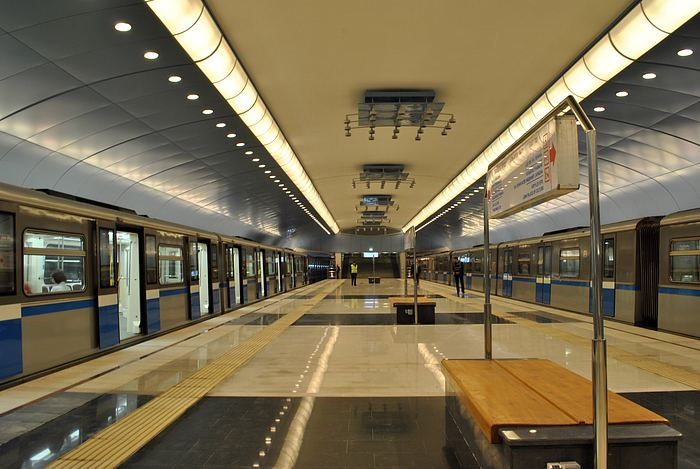

General information
- Coordinates: 55°51′15″N 49°05′04″E
- Owner: Kazan Metro
- Platforms: 1 Island platform
- Tracks: 2

History
- Opened: 9 May 2013

Services
| Preceding station | Kazan Metro | Following station |
|---|---|---|
| Terminus | First Line | Severny Vokzal towards Dubravnaya |
Location

Aviastroitelnaya (Russian: Авиастроительная) is a station on the Kazan Metro that opened on 9 May 2013. It was part of the northern extension of the Kazan Metro along with Yashlek and Severny Vokzal that opened on 9 May 2013.
