= Dubravnaya (Kazan Metro) =

Kazan Metro Station

Coordinates: 55°44′25″N 49°13′31″E

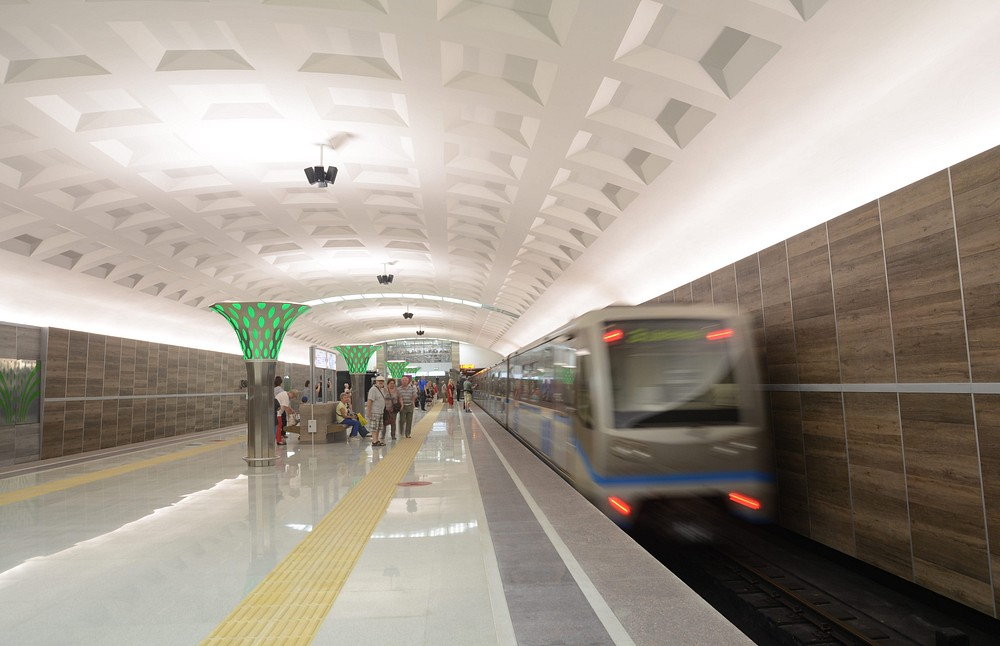

General information
- Owner: Kazan Metropoliten
- Platforms: 1

History
- Opened: 30 August 2018

Services
Preceding station	Kazan Metro	Following station
Prospekt Pobedy towards Aviastroitelnaya	First Line	Terminus
Location

Dubravnaya (Russian) is a station in the Kazan Metro, a rapid-transit system serving Kazan in the Republic of Tatarstan, Russia. It is the southern terminal of the first line. The station was opened on 30 August 2018.
