= Tiantongyuandong station =

Beijing Subway Line 17 and Line 18 station

Tiantongyuandong 天通苑东
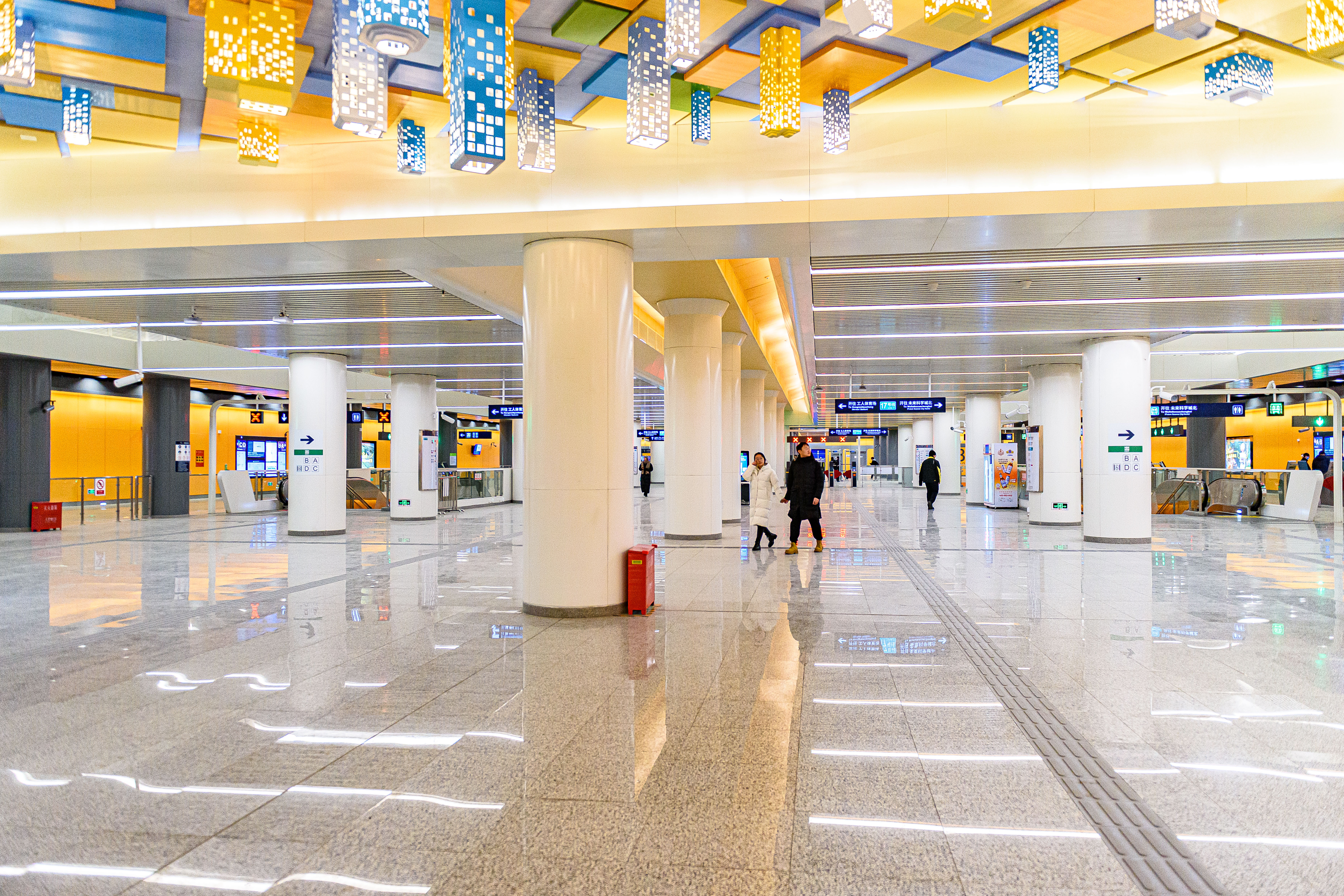
- Concourse

General information
- Location: Interchange between Baifang Road (白坊路) and Beiyuan East Road (北苑东路); Border between Tiantongyuanbei Subdistrict and Tiantongyuannan Subdistrict, Changping District, Beijing; People's Republic of China
- Coordinates: 40.06498°N 116.43592°E
- Operator: Beijing MTR (Line 17); Beijing Mass Transit Railway Operation Corporation Limited (Line 18)
- Lines: Line 17; Line 18
- Platforms: 6 (3 island platforms)
- Tracks: 6

Construction
- Structure type: Underground
- Accessible: Yes

History
- Opened: Line 17: December 30, 2023; 2 years ago; Line 18: December 27, 2025; 7 months ago

Services
Preceding station	Beijing Subway	Following station
Weilaikexuecheng (Future Science City) towards Weilaikexuechengbei (Future Science City North)	Line 17	Qingheying towards Jiahuihu
Taipingzhuang towards Malianwa	Line 18	Terminus
Location
- Location within Beijing

Tiantongyuandong station (Chinese: 天通苑东站; pinyin: Tiāntōngyuàn Dōng Zhàn; lit. 'Tiantongyuan East') is an interchange station between Line 17 and Line 18 of the Beijing Subway. The Line 17 station opened on December 30, 2023, becoming the fourth subway station within Tiantongyuan area. Line 18 opened at this station on December 27, 2025.

== Location ==
The station is located under the interchange between Baifang Road (白坊路) and Beiyuan East Road (北苑东路) on the border between Tiantongyuanbei Subdistrict and Tiantongyuannan Subdistrict, in Changping, Beijing.

== Station features ==
The Line 17 station has 2 underground island platforms and 4 tracks, with a total length of 555.9 metres and a total width of the main structure of 45.3 metres. The Line 18 station has a separate underground island platform.

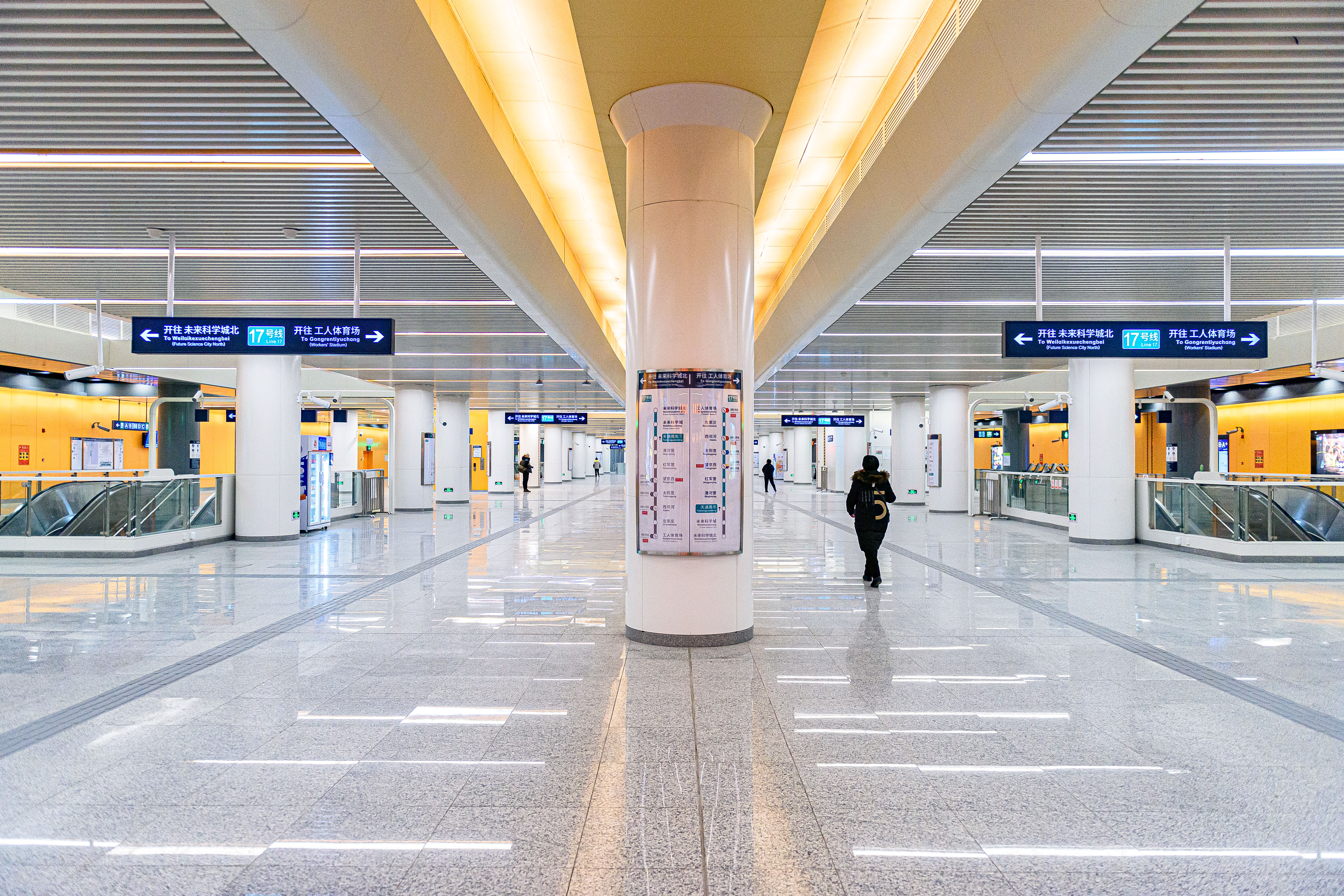
Concourse

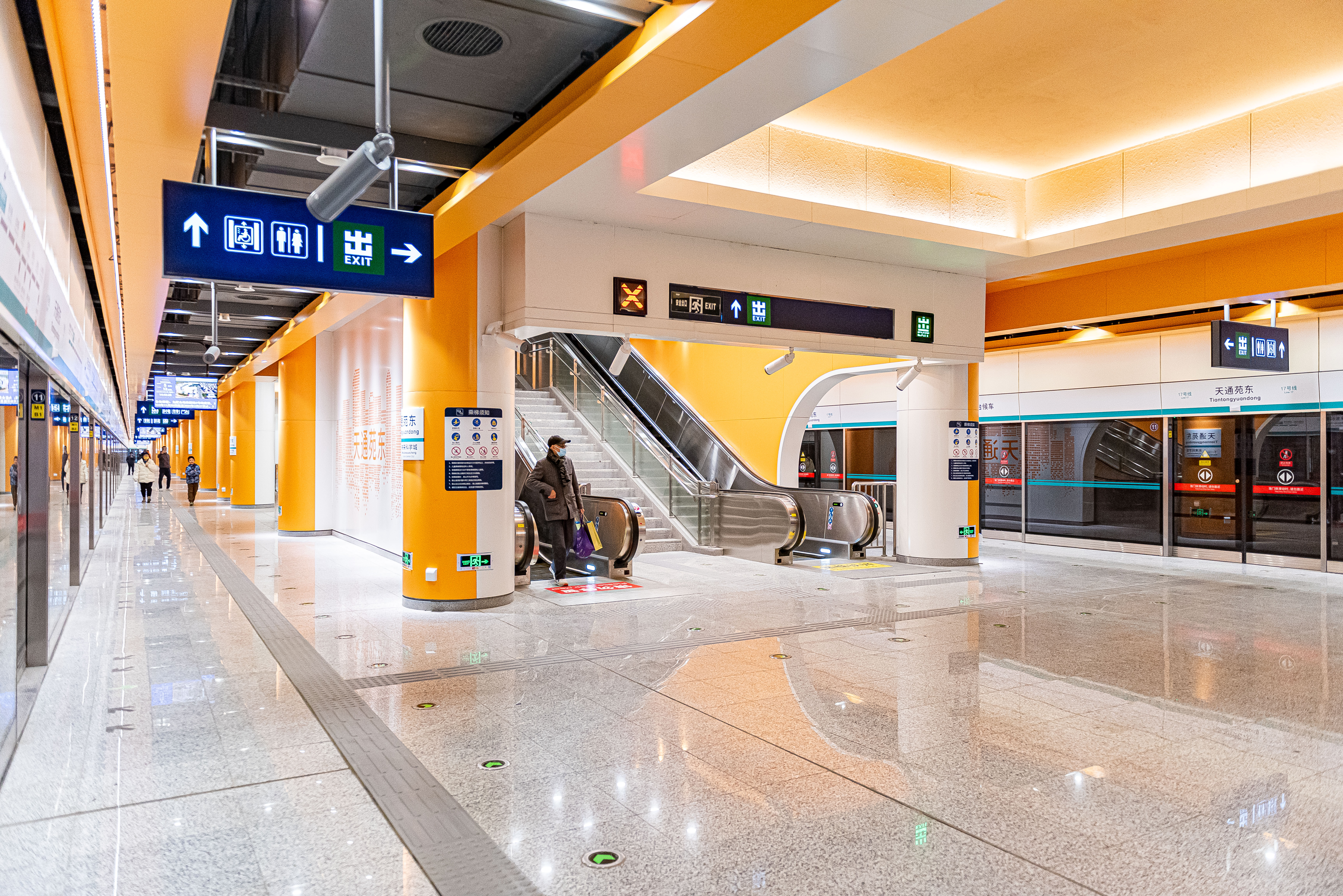
Line 17 northbound platform

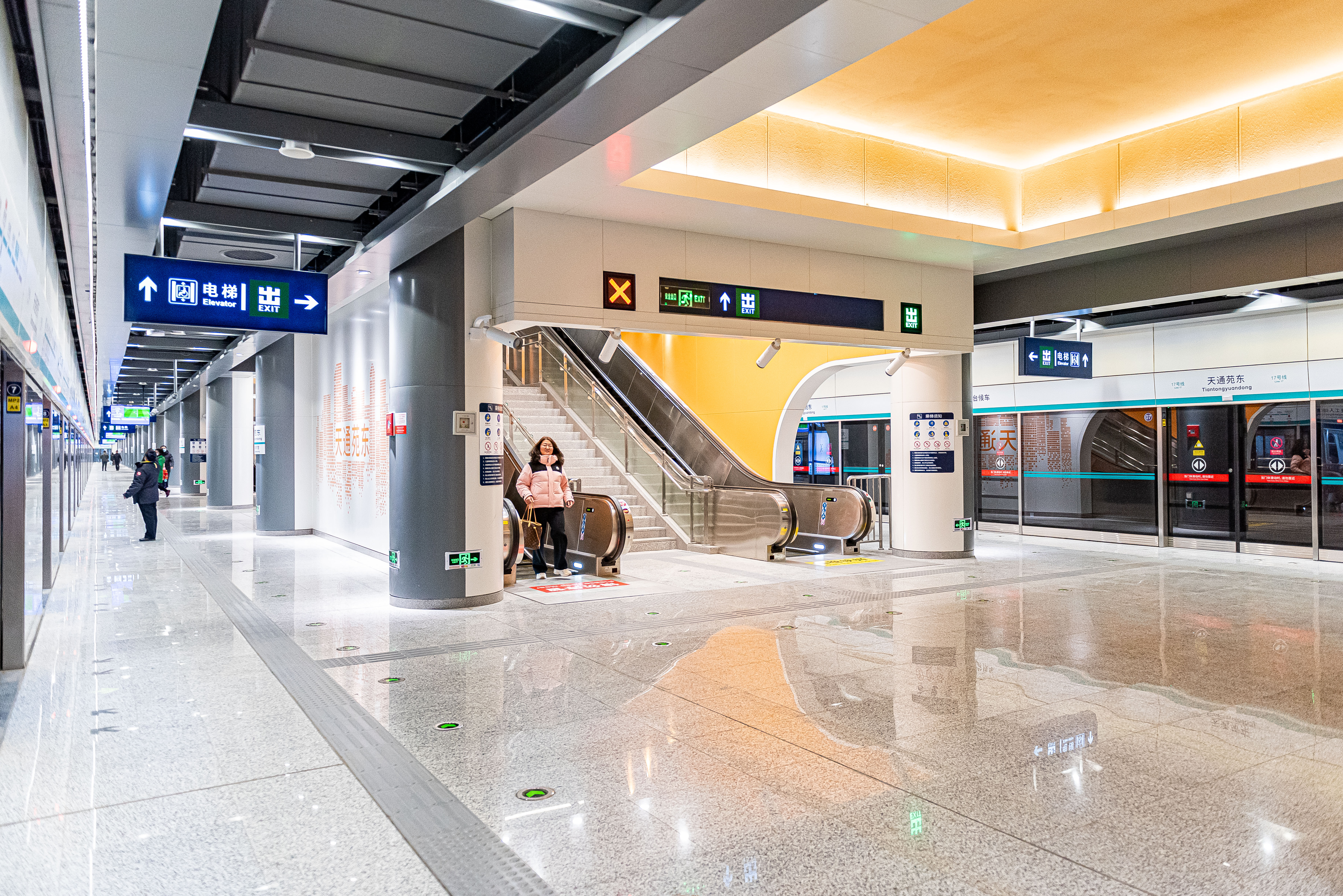
Line 17 southbound platform

=== Exits ===
When the station initially opened, there were 5 exits, lettered A, B, C, D_{1} and D_{2}. All of them led to Beiyuan East Road. When the Line 18 station opened, Exits E and F opened, which led to Baifang Road. Exit C and E are accessible via elevators.

== History and future development ==
The structure of the station was completed in early 2022.

The station is planned to be the interchange station with Line 18 and main line and branch line of Line 17, with the former having opened on December 27, 2025.
