= Dongxiaokou =

Dongxiaokou Town 东小口镇
- Town
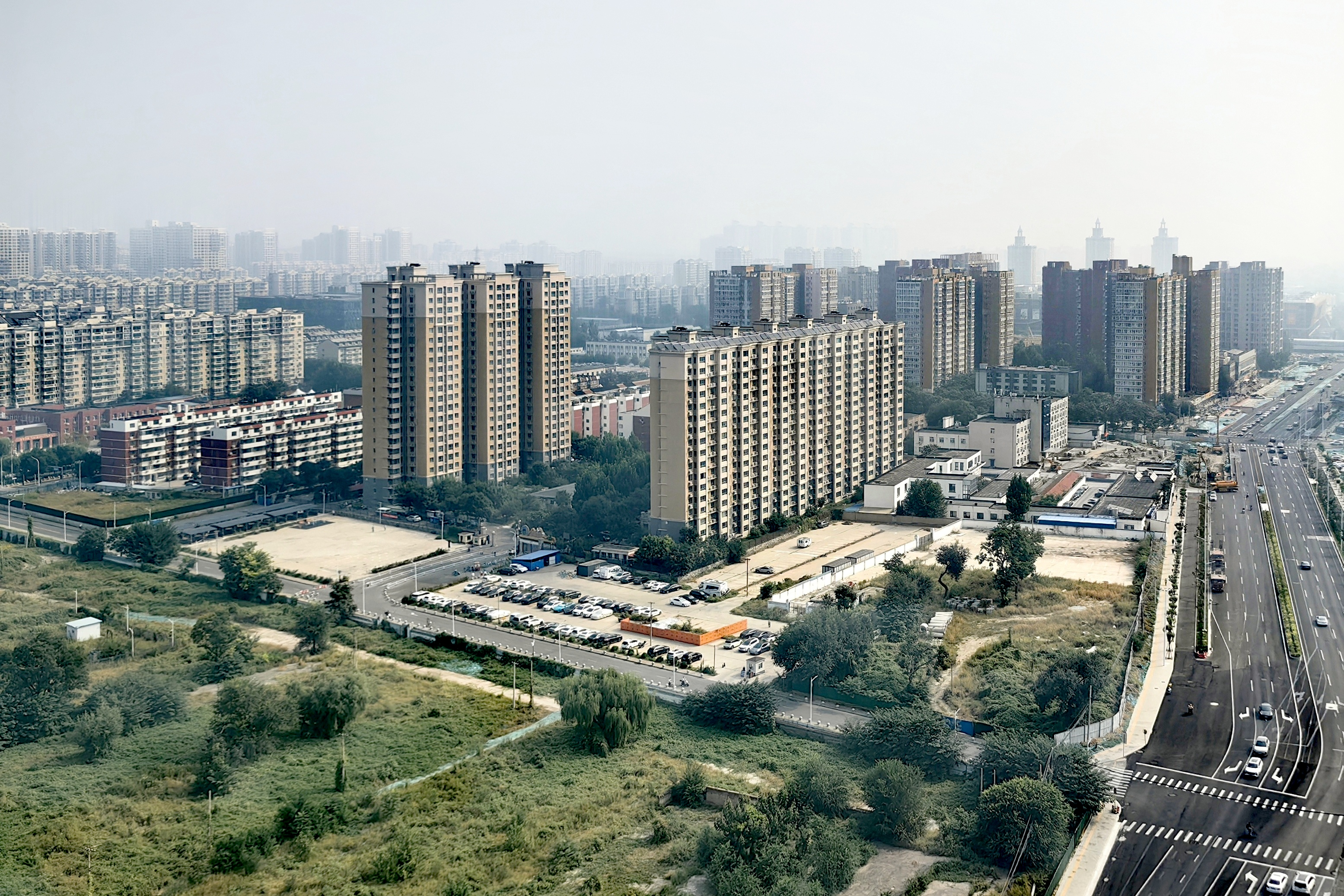
- Near Zhongdong Road No.28 (2025)

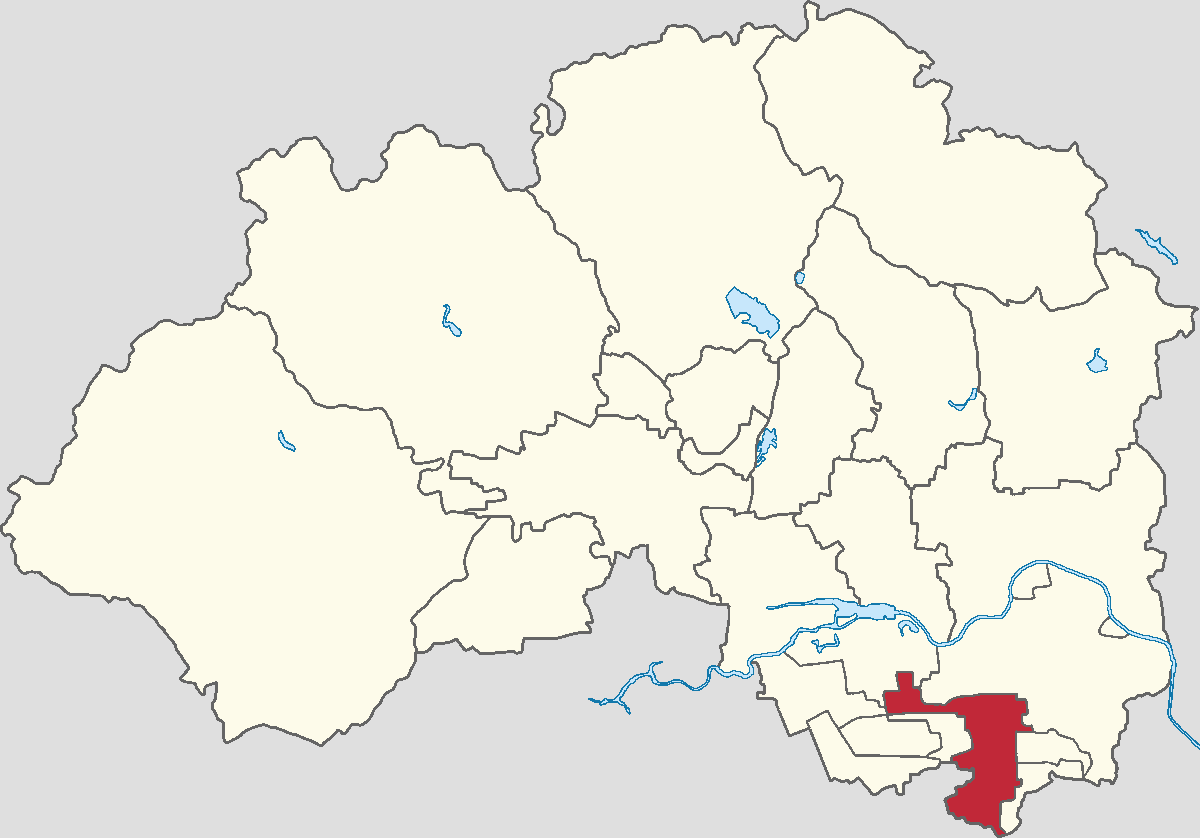
- Location of Dongxiaokou Town within Changping District

- Location within Beijing Location within China
- Coordinates: 40°03′24″N 116°24′09″E
- Country: China
- Municipality: Beijing
- District: Changping
- Village-level Divisions: 5 communities 10 villages

Area
  - Total: 17.88 km^{2} (6.90 sq mi)
- Elevation: 37 m (121 ft)

Population (2020)
  - Total: 85,874
  - Density: 4,803/km^{2} (12,440/sq mi)
- Time zone: UTC+8 (China Standard)
- Postal code: 102218
- Area code: 010

Dongxiaokou Town (Chinese: 东小口镇; pinyin: Dōngxiǎokǒu Zhèn) is a town located in southern Changping District, Beijing, China. Dongxiaokou borders Shahe and Beiqijia Towns in its north, Tiantongyuanbei and Tiantongyuannan Subdistricts in its east, Dongsheng Town and Huoying Subdistrict in its west, and Shigezhuang Subdistrict in its northwest. As of 2020, its population was 85,874.

== History ==
Timeline of Dongxiaokou Town
Time	Status	Part of
1958–1959		Haidian District
1959–1961	Within Shahe People's Commune	Changping County
1961–1983	Dongxiaokou People's Commune	Changping County
1983–1997	Dongxiaokou Township	Changping County
1997–1999	Dongxiaokou Town (merged with Huoying Township in 1999)	Changping County
1999–2004	Dongxiaokou Town (merged with Huoying Township in 1999)	Changping District
2004–present	Dongxiaokou Area (Dongxiaokou Town)	Changping District

== Administrative divisions ==
By the end of 2021, Dongxiaokou Town had direct jurisdiction over 15 subdivisions, in which 5 were communities, and 10 were villages:

Administrative division code	Subdivision names	Name transliteration	Type
110114007010	九台	Jiutai	Community
110114007011	都市芳园	Dushifangyuan	Community
110114007030	森林大第家园	Senlindadijiayuan	Community
110114007044	森林大第家园南区	Senlindadijiayuannanqu	Community
110114007045	悦府家园	Yuefujiayuan	Community
110114007203	东小口	Dongxiaokou	Village
110114007204	中滩	Zhongtan	Village
110114007205	芦家	Lujia	Village
110114007206	单家	Shanjia	Village
110114007207	店上	Dianshang	Village
110114007208	兰各庄	Langezhuang	Village
110114007211	半截塔	Banjieta	Village
110114007212	魏窑	Weiyao	Village
110114007213	小辛庄	Xiaoxinzhuang	Village
110114007214	马连店	Maliandian	Village

== See also ==
- List of township-level divisions of Beijing
