= Tiantongyuan =

Resident area of Changping, Beijing, China

Coordinates: 40.0689°N 116.4178°E

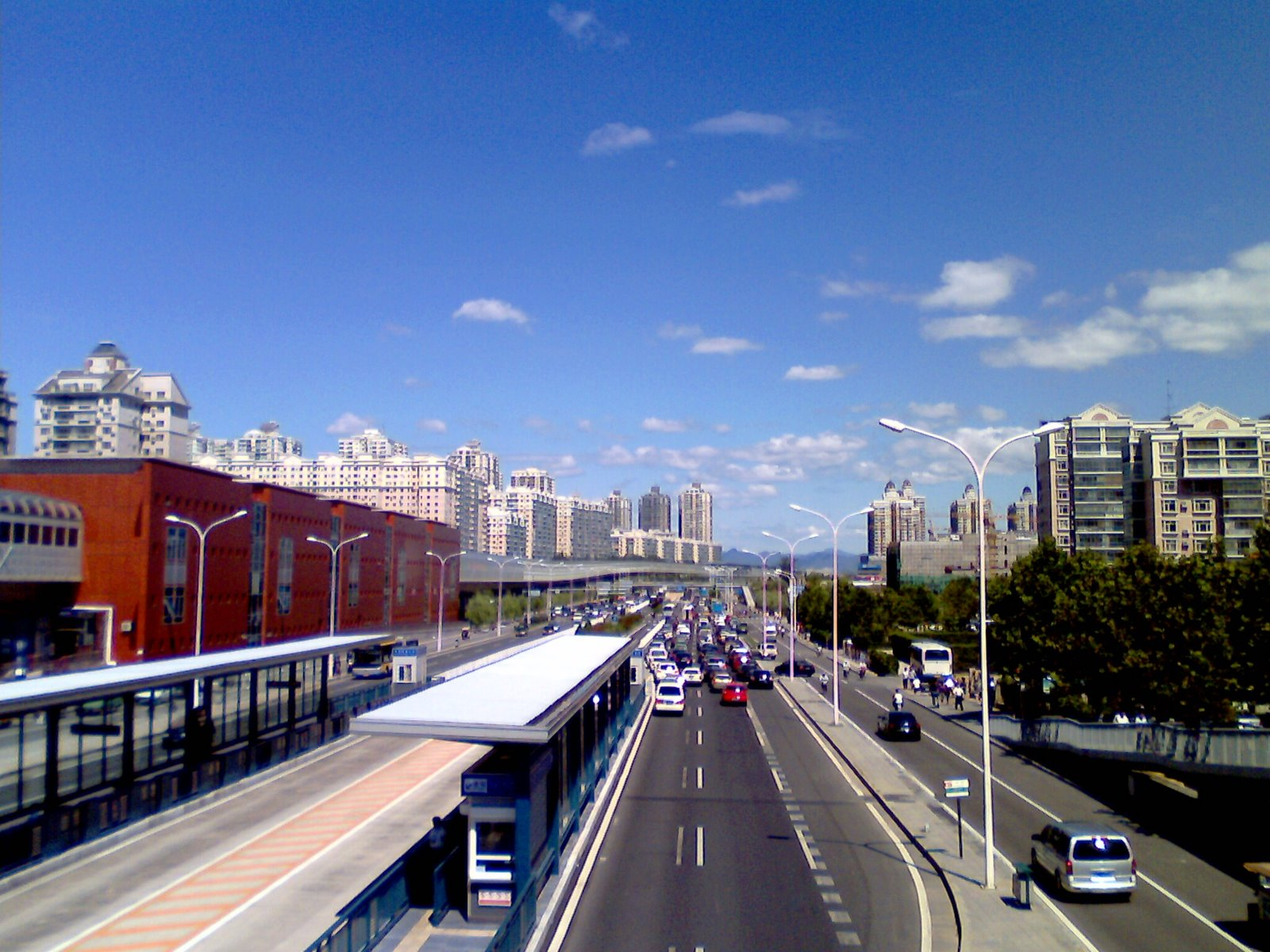
Tiantongyuan South subway station (Line 5) visible to the left

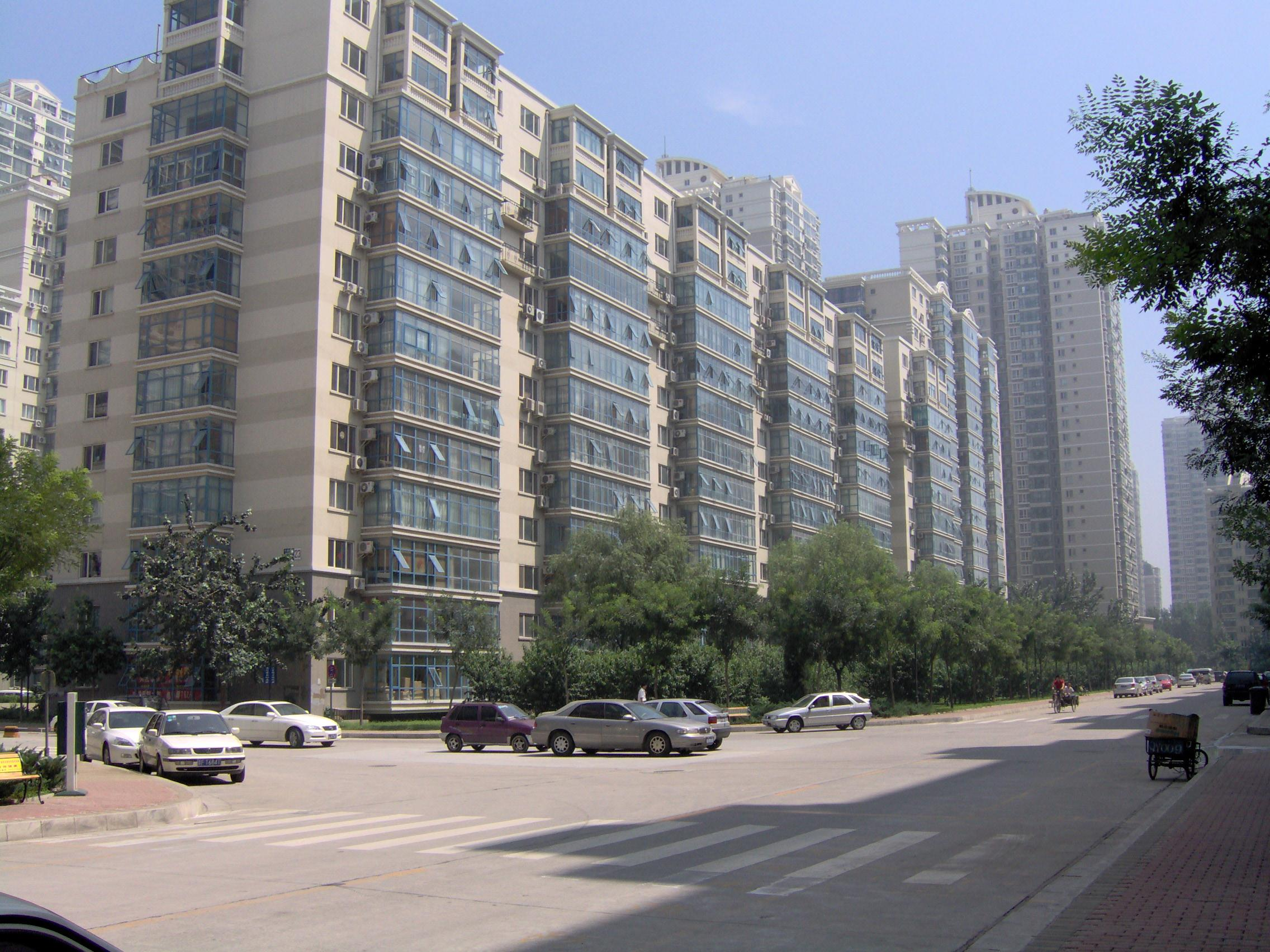
Tiantongxiyuan, section 3

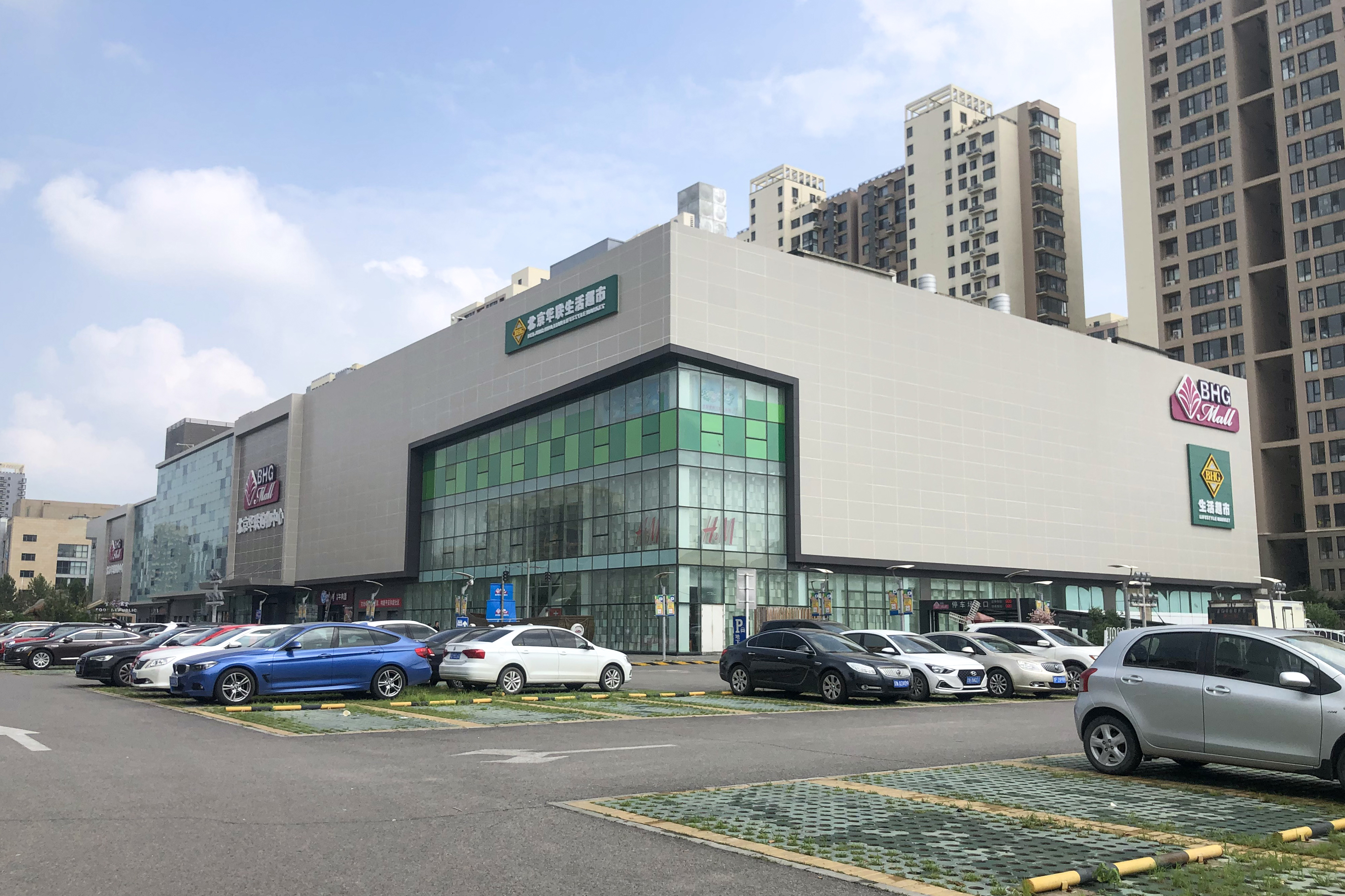
BHG Mall at Tiantongyuan

Tiantongyuan (Chinese: 天通苑; pinyin: Tiāntōngyuàn) is a resident area in northern Beijing's Changping District, under the administration of Tiantongyuanbei and Tiantongyuannan Subdistricts. As of April 2008, it was said to have over 400,000 residents. As of 2019, the population of Tiantongyuan had jumped to 700,000, making it the largest Xiaoqu (housing community) in China, and the suburb accounts for 3% of the population of Beijing.

Tiantongyuan is divided into Tiantongxiyuan (天通西苑), Tiantongdongyuan (天通东苑), Tiantongbeiyuan (天通北苑), Tiantongzhongyuan (天通中苑), and Old Tiantongyuan (本区 or 老区); each such neighborhood is further subdivided into sections 1, 2, and 3 (except for Tiantongzhongyuan, which is further divided into North, South, East, West and Northeast).

During the early decades of the People's Republic, the area was the site of a labor camp for class enemies.

== Shopping ==
Tiantongyuan has two shopping malls, namely Longde Plaza (龙德广场, Lóngdé guǎngchǎng) and BHG Mall Tiantongyuan Shopping Center (北京华联天通苑购物中心, Beǐjīng Huálián Tiāntōngyuàn gòuwù zhōngxīn). These malls are about a kilometer apart. Longde Plaza contains a branch of Carrefour.

== Transport ==
Both Beijing Subway Line 5 and the BRT3 bus serve the area, as do many other Beijing public buses. There are transport hubs at Tiantongyuan North subway station, in Tiantongyuanbei Subdistrict.

Tiantongyuan North is the northern terminus of Line 5 of the Beijing subway system. There are two other Line 5 stations in Tiantongyuan, namely Tiantongyuan and Tiantongyuan South. A subway journey from Tiantongyuan to Dongdan (which is on Line 5 in the core area of Beijing) takes about 35 minutes. A fourth subway station, Tiantongyuandong station on Line 17, opened on 30 December 2023, providing direct access to Sanlitun. Future expansion of the subway system will see Tiantongyuan acquire one new station, Taipingzhuang station, located on Line 18 between Tiantongyuan station and Tiantongyuandong station.

== See also ==
- Tiantongyuanbei Subdistrict
- Tiantongyuannan Subdistrict
