= Kukisvumchorr Microdistrict =

Microdistrict in Kirovsk, Murmansk, Russia

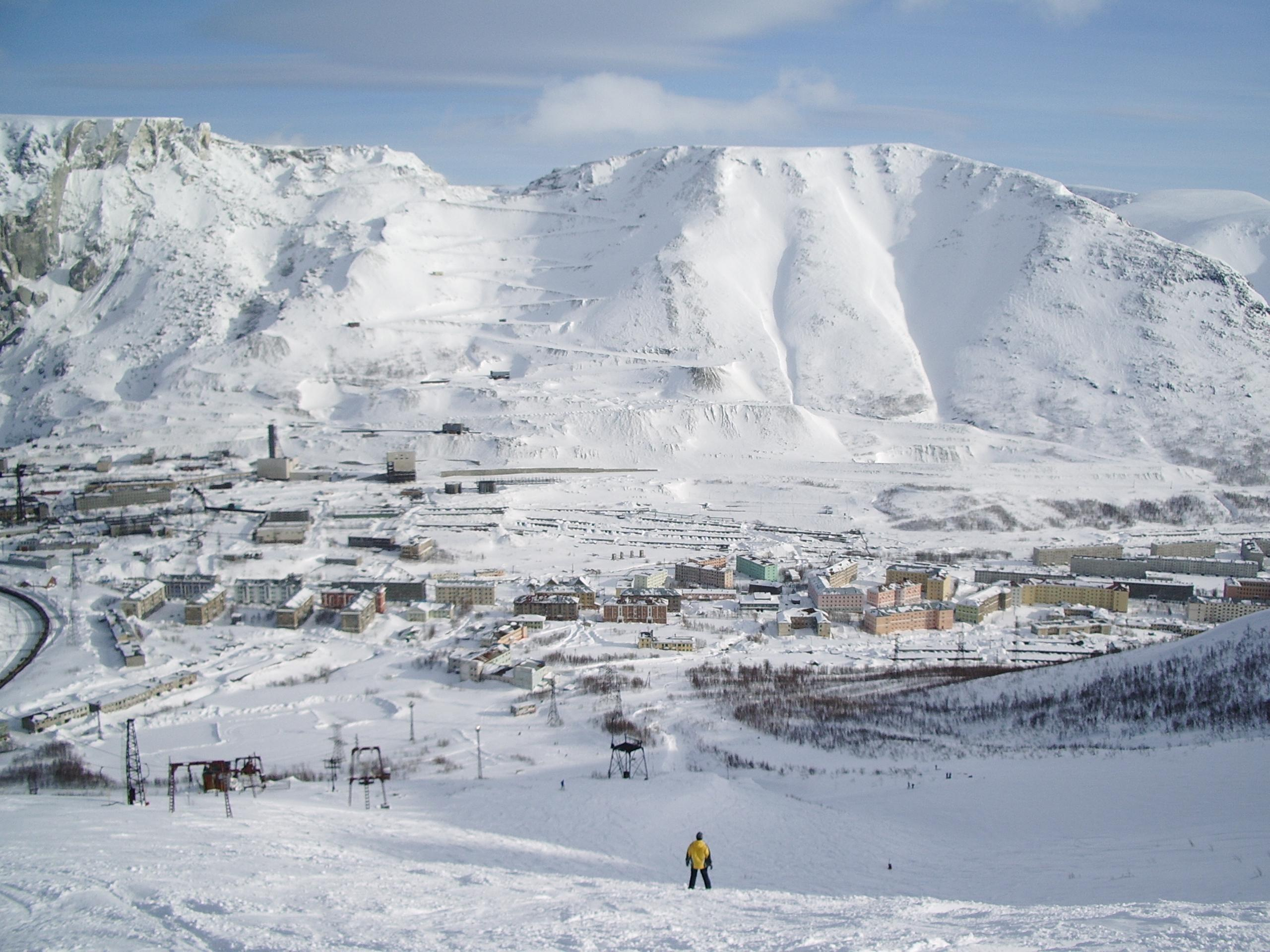
View of the town from Kukisvumchorr mountain

Kukisvumchorr (Russian: Кукисвумчорр), Kukisvunchor or Kukisvumtschorr is a microdistrict of Kirovsk, Murmansk Oblast and former work settlement. It was merged into Kirovsk in 1959. Its 1939 population was 8,950.
