= Taipingzhuang station =

Beijing Subway Line 18 station

Taipingzhuang 太平庄
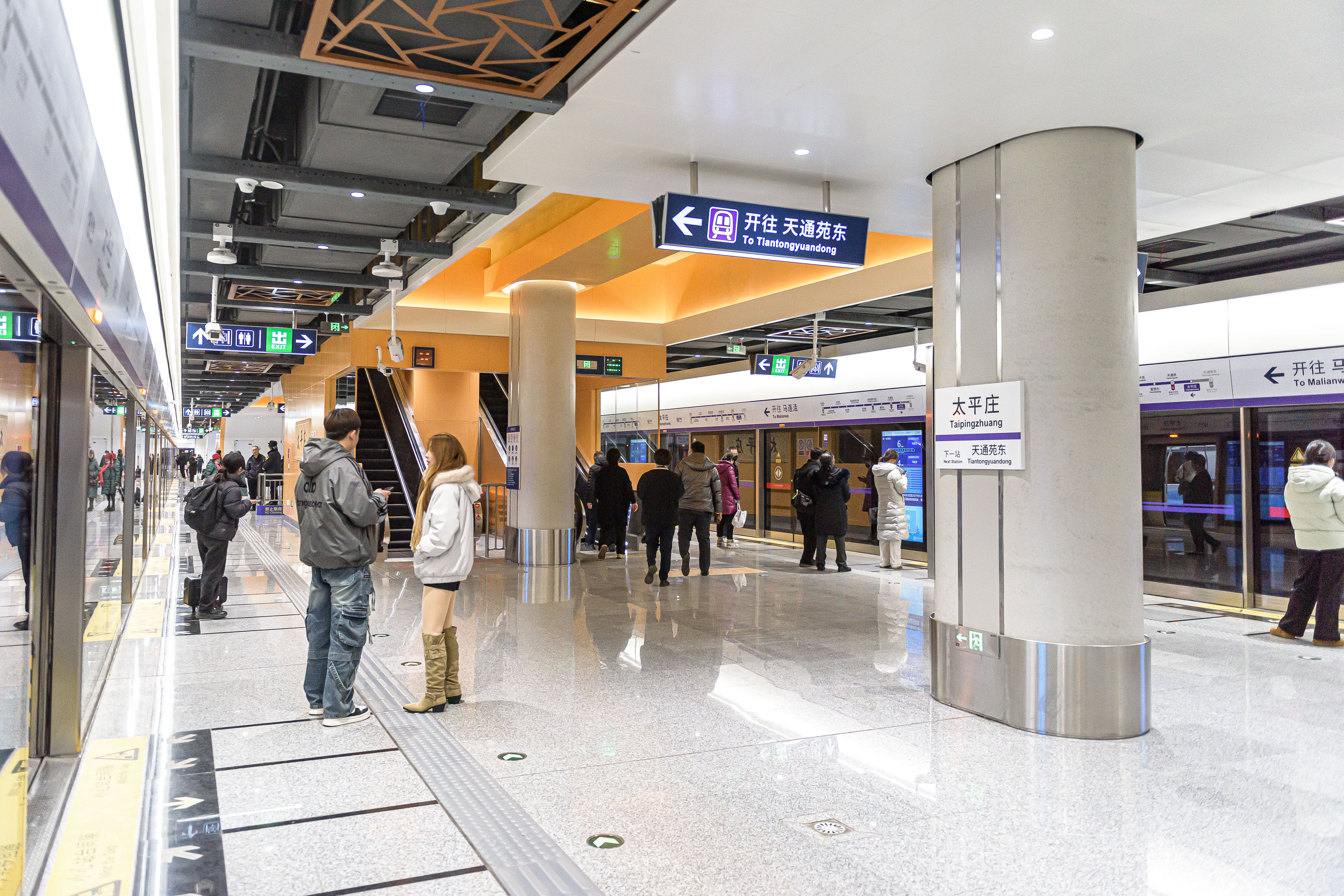
- Platform

Chinese name
- Simplified Chinese: 太平庄站
- Traditional Chinese: 太平莊站
Transcriptions
Standard Mandarin
- Hanyu Pinyin: Tàipíngzhuāng zhàn

General information
- Location: West side of the intersection of Lishuiqiao East 3rd Road (立水桥东三路) and Taipingzhuang Middle 2nd Street (太平庄中二街), Taipingzhuang Village, Tiantongyuanbei Subdistrict; Changping District, Beijing; China
- Coordinates: 40°04′22″N 116°25′14″E
- System: Beijing Subway station
- Operator: Beijing Mass Transit Railway Operation Corporation Limited
- Line: Line 18
- Platforms: 2 (1 island platform)
- Tracks: 2

Construction
- Structure type: Underground
- Accessible: Yes

History
- Opened: December 27, 2025; 7 months ago
- Former names: Dongsanlu (东三路)

Services
Preceding station	Beijing Subway	Following station
Tiantongyuan towards Malianwa	Line 18	Tiantongyuandong Terminus
Location
- Location within Beijing

Taipingzhuang station (simplified Chinese: 太平庄站; traditional Chinese: 太平莊站; pinyin: Tàipíngzhuāng zhàn) is a station on Line 18 of the Beijing Subway. It opened on December 27, 2025.

== Location ==
The station is located under the west side of the intersection of Lishuiqiao East 3rd Road (立水桥东三路) and Taipingzhuang Middle 2nd Street (太平庄中二街), in Taipingzhuang Village, Tiantongyuanbei Subdistrict, Changping District.

== Station features ==
The station has an underground island platform.

=== Exits ===
The station has 4 exits, lettered A1, A2, B1 and B2. There is also an unassigned elevator exit.

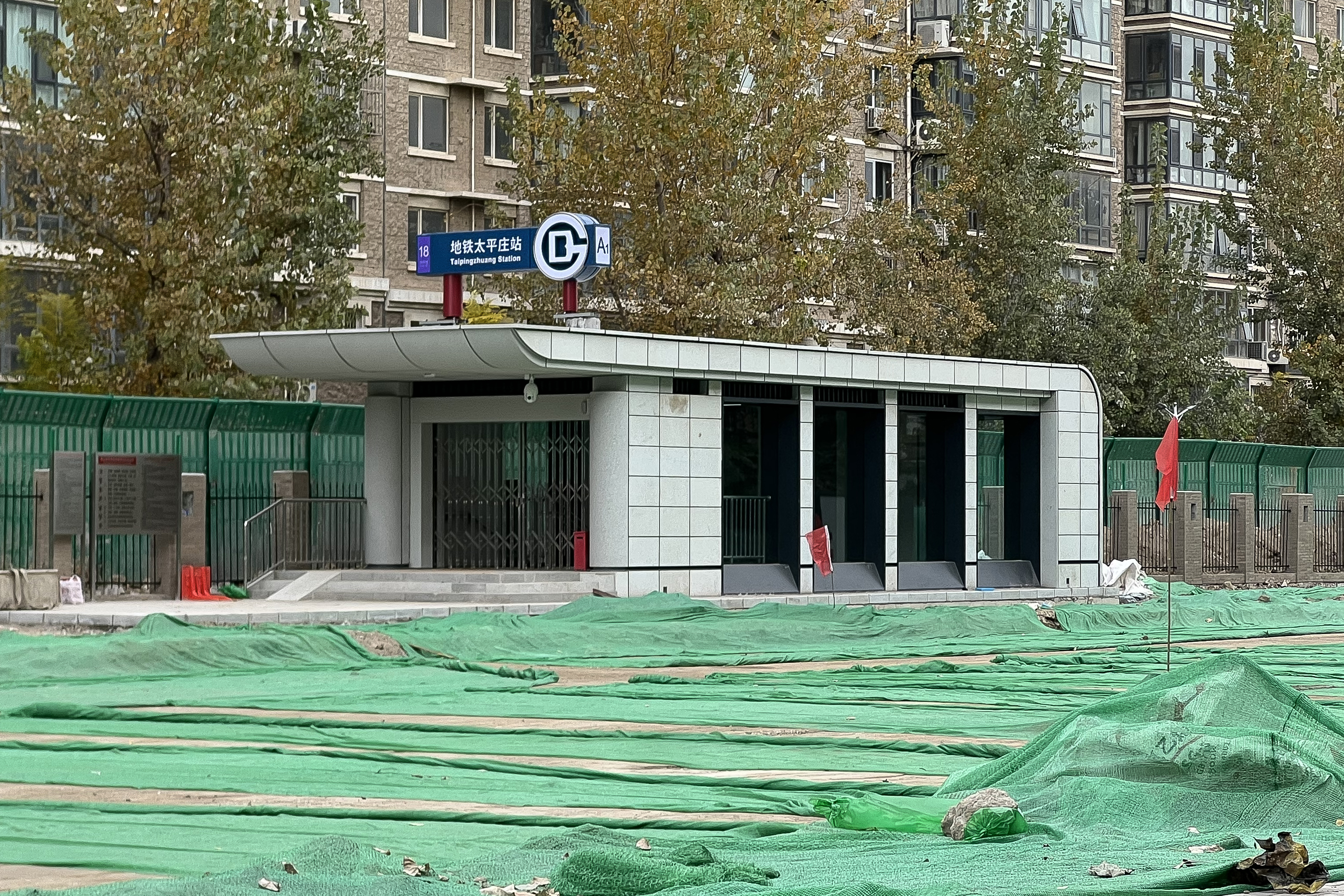
Exit A1

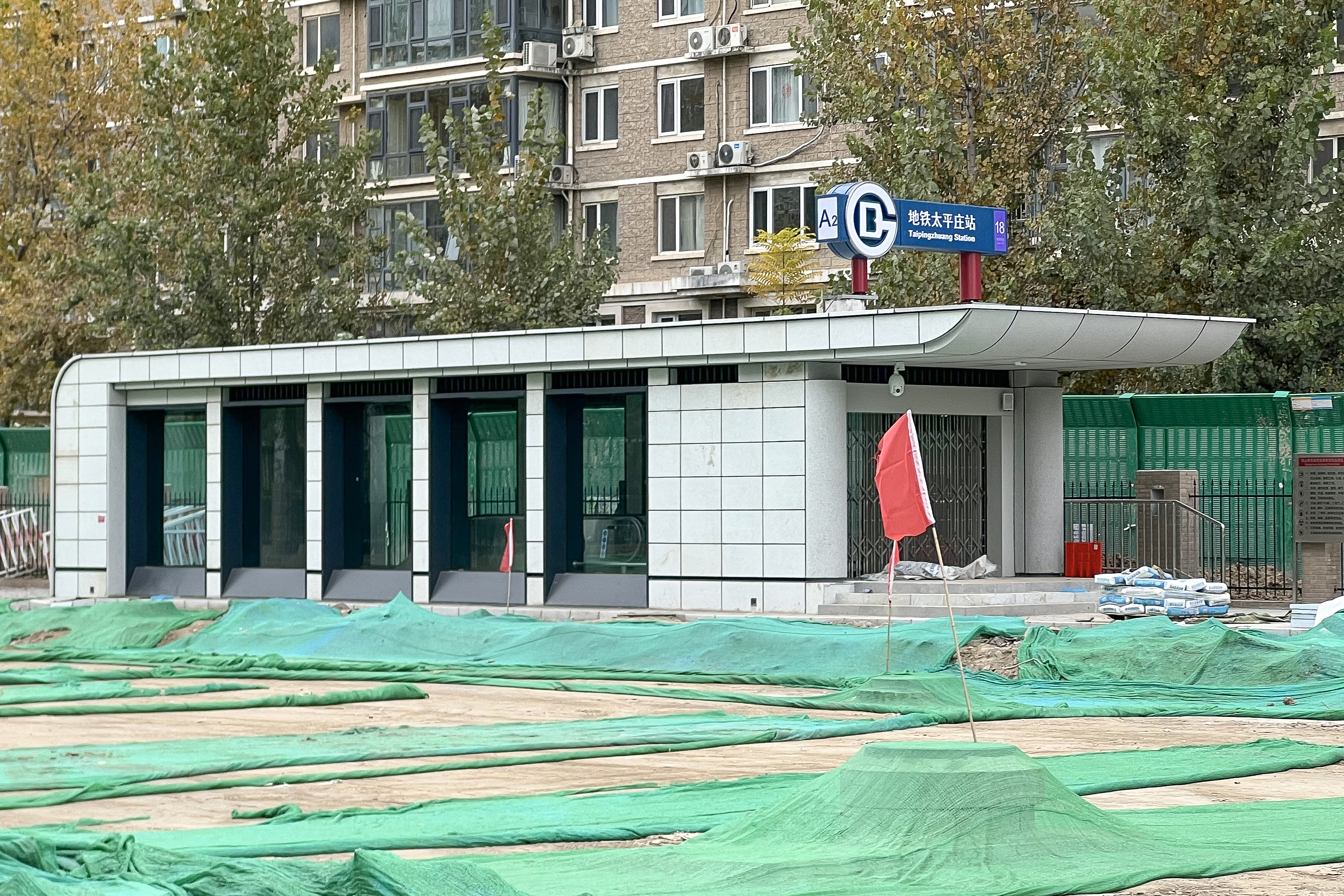
Exit A2

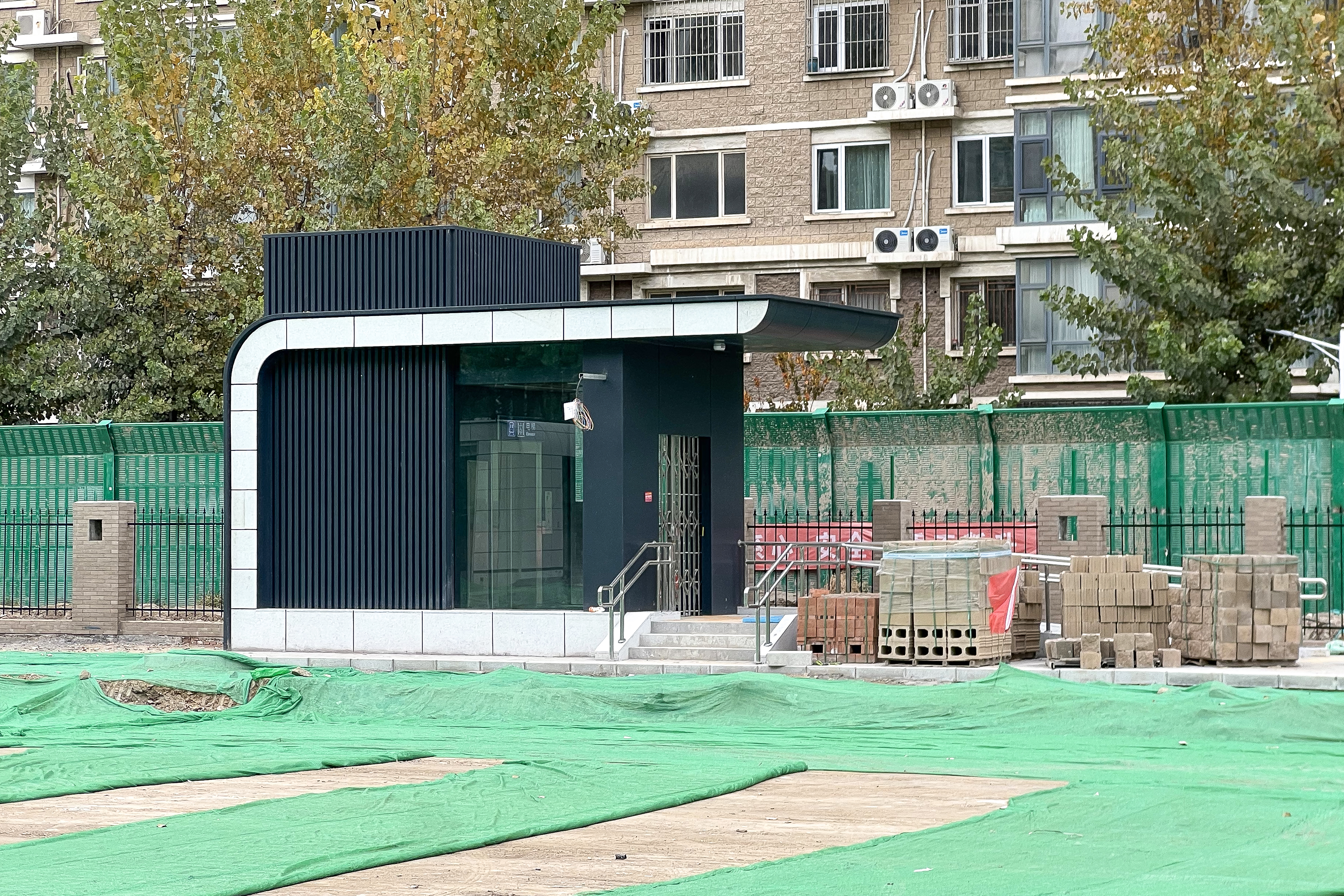
Elevator exit

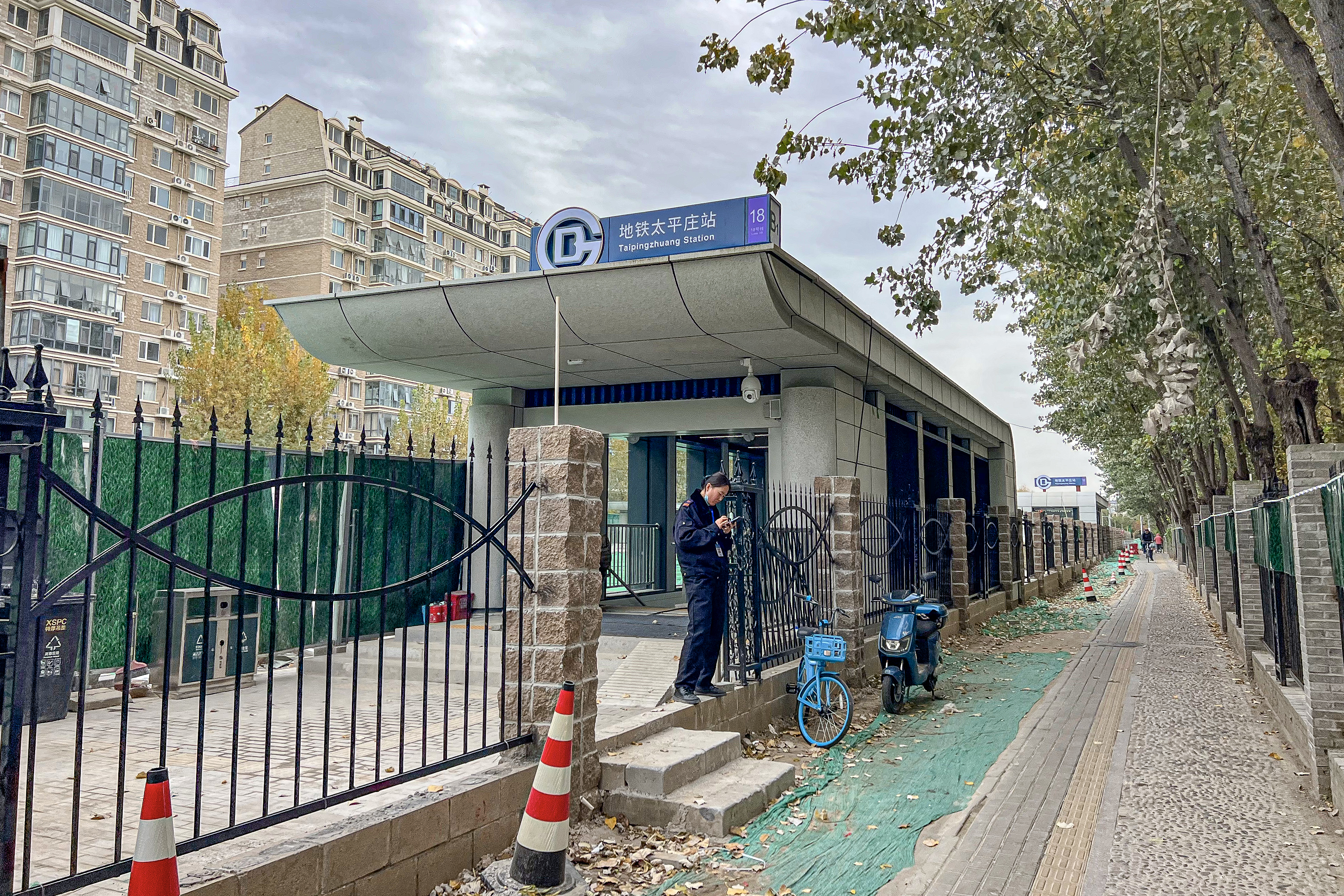
Exit B1

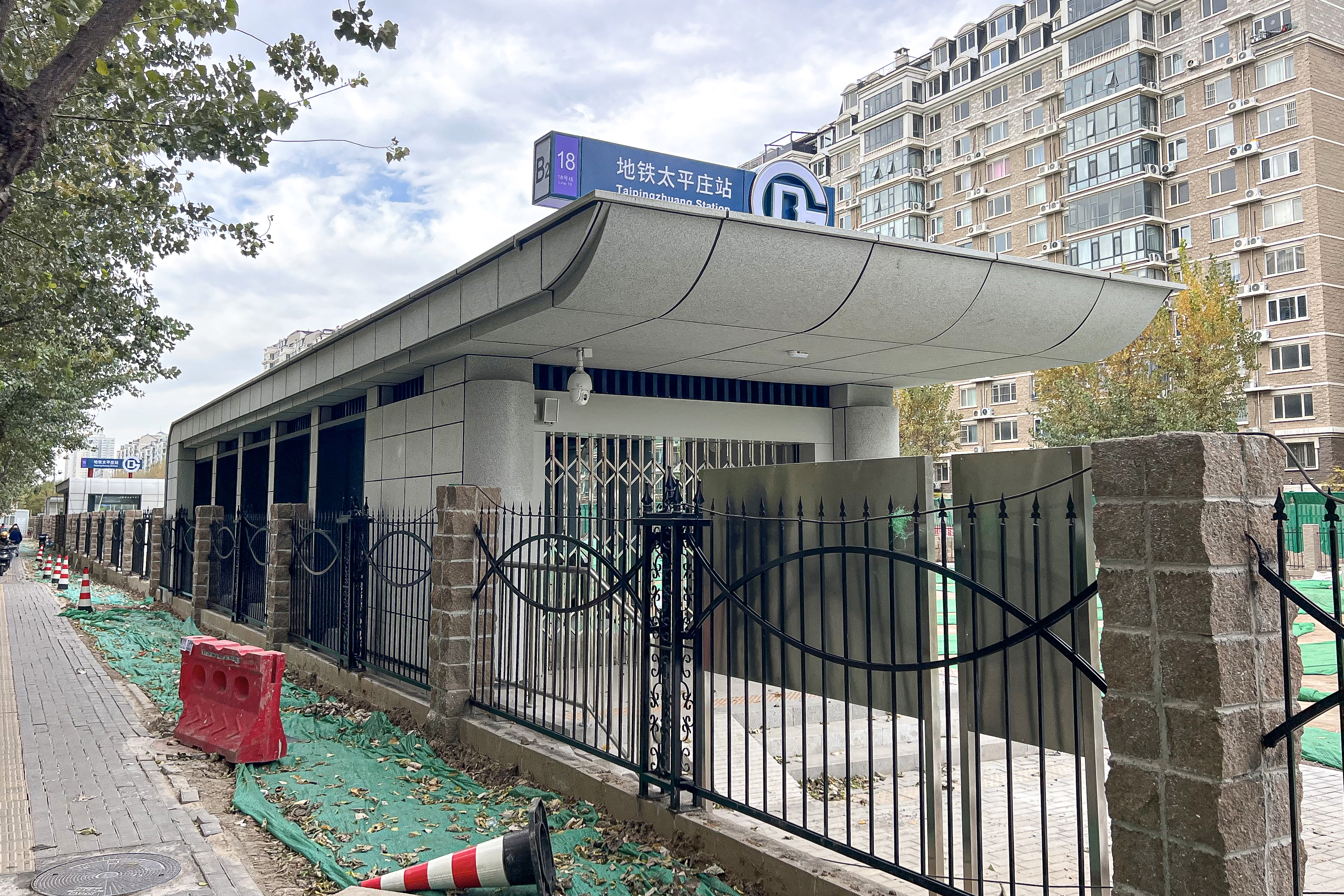
Exit B2

== History ==
On November 25, 2024, the main structure of the station was topped out.

On March 20, 2025, the Beijing Municipal Commission of Planning and Natural Resources announced the naming plan for the expansion and upgrading project of Line 13, and planned to name the station as Taipingzhuang.
