= Microdistrict =

Residential complex in the Soviet Union and post-Soviet states

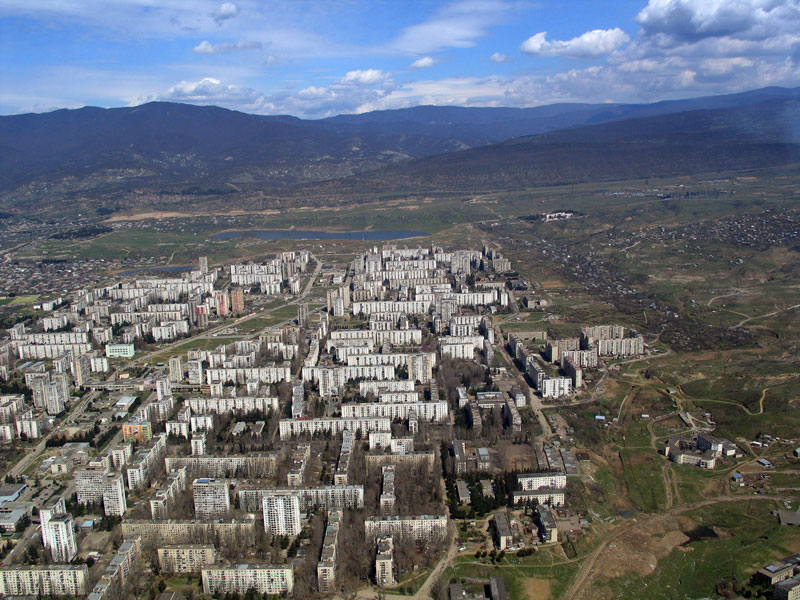
One of the typical Tbilisi, Georgia microdistricts

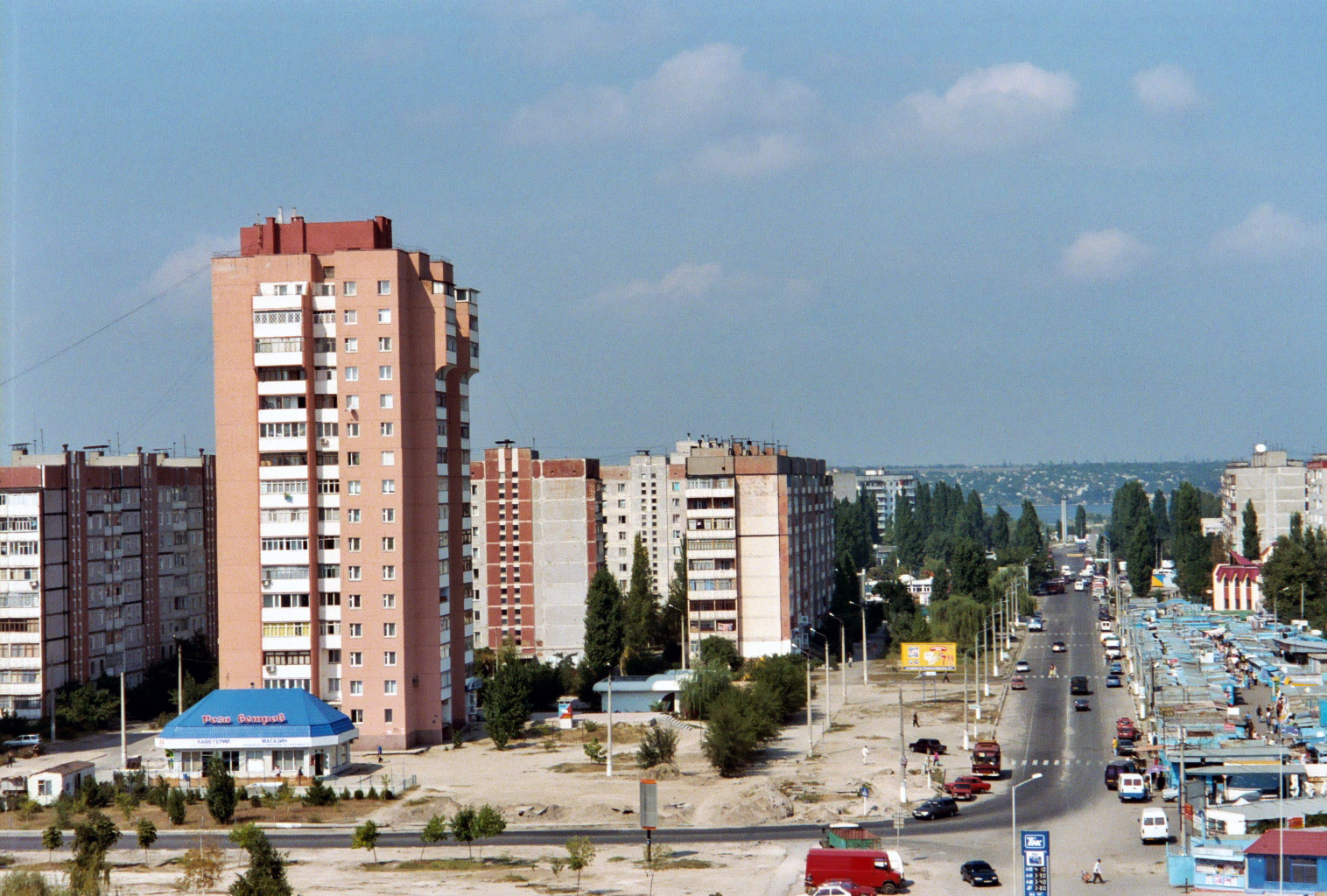
View of Namyv microdistrict in Mykolaiv, Ukraine

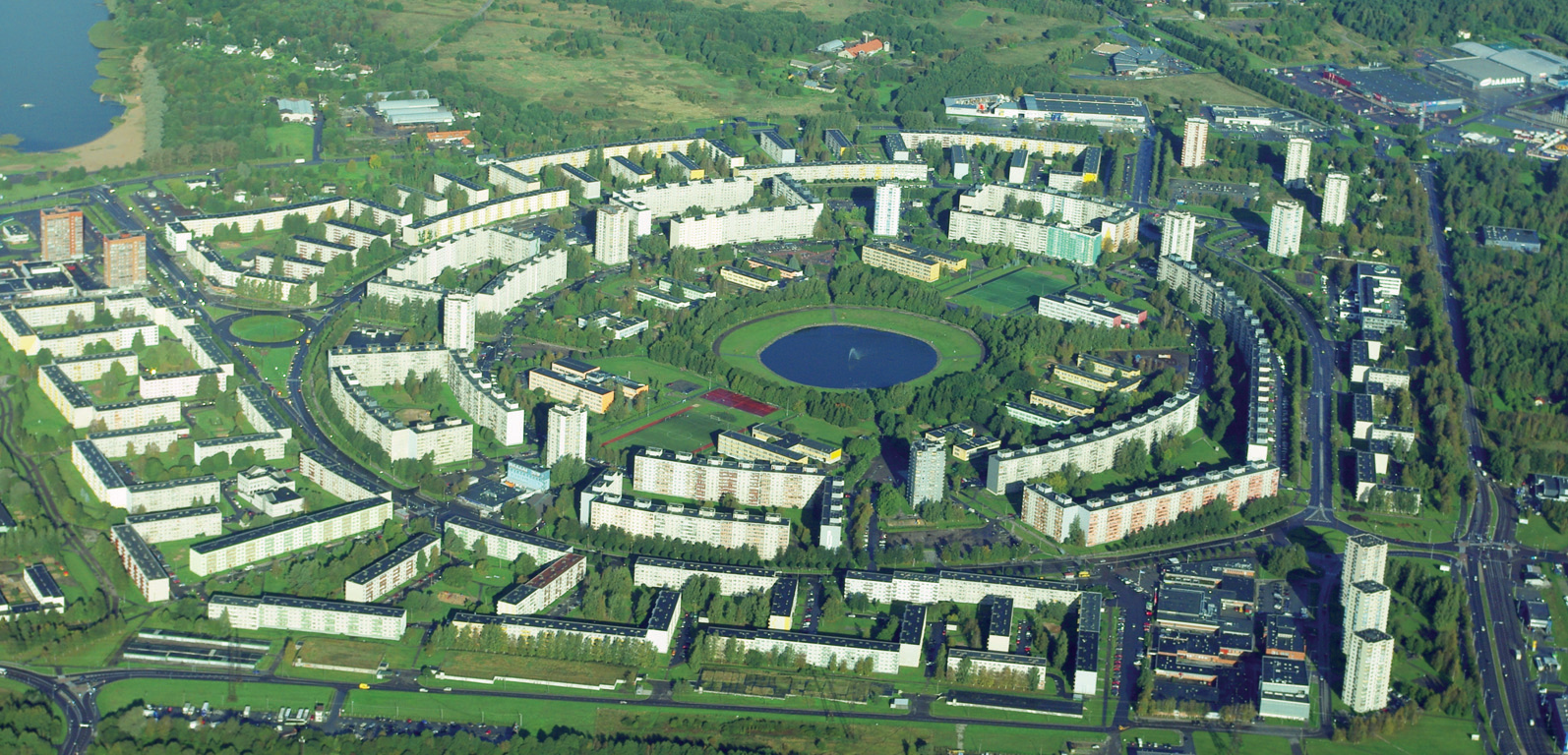
Aerial view of Väike-Õismäe, Tallinn, Estonia

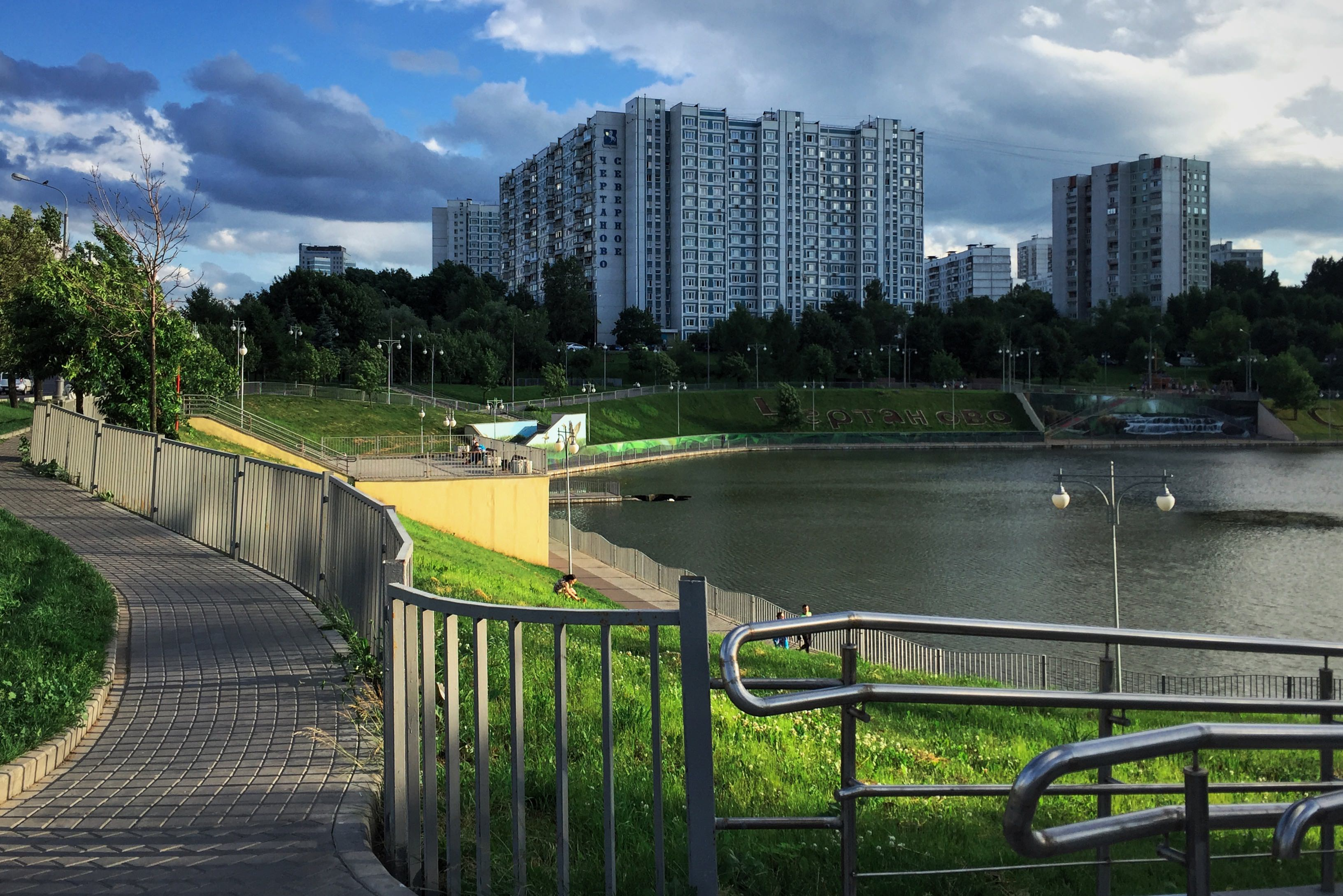
Chertanovo Severnoye District, Moscow, Russia

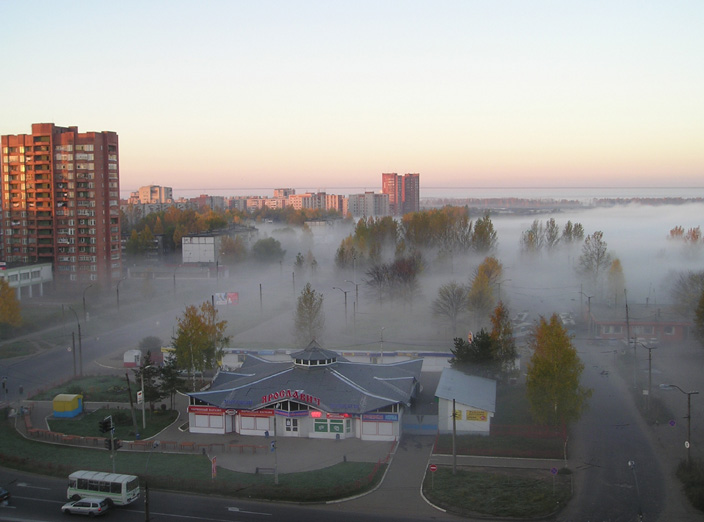
Bragino microdistrict in Yaroslavl, Russia

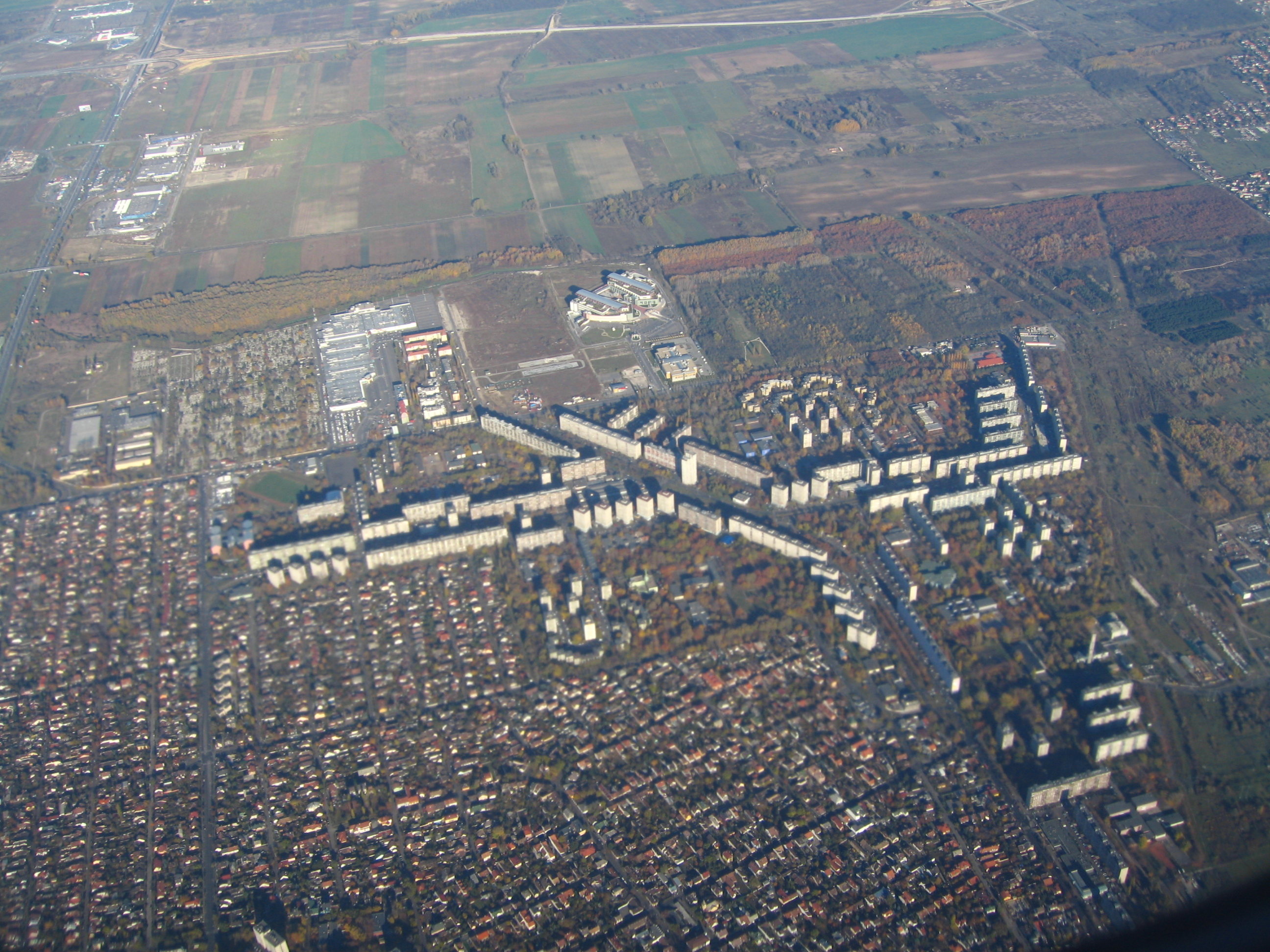
Újpalota, Budapest, Hungary

A microdistrict or microraion (Note: Russian: микрорайо́н, romanized: mikrorayon, IPA: [ˌmʲikrərɐˈjɵn]; Ukrainian: мікрорайо́н, romanized: mikroraion, IPA: [mikrorɐˈjɔn].) is a residential complex—a primary structural element of the residential area construction in the Soviet Union and in some post-Soviet and former socialist states. Residential districts in most of the cities and towns in Russia and the republics of the former Soviet Union were built in accordance with this concept.

According to the Construction Rules and Regulations of the Soviet Union, a typical microdistrict covered the area of 10–60 hectares (30–160 acres), up to but not exceeding 80 hectares (200 acres) in some cases, and comprised residential dwellings (usually multi-story apartment buildings) and public service buildings. As a general rule, major motor roads, greenways, and natural obstacles served as boundaries between microdistricts, allowing an overall reduction in city road construction and maintenance costs and emphasizing public transportation. Major motor roads or through streets were not to cross microdistricts' territories. The entrances to a microdistrict's territory were to be located no further than 300 meters (1000 ft) apart.

Standards also regulated the accessibility of the public service buildings (excluding schools and pre-school facilities) by imposing a 500-meter (1,500–foot) limit as the farthest distance from any residential dwelling. Unlike Western countries, the Soviet Union did not redevelop existing residential or commercial areas; microdistricts were always built further and further out from old parts of cities, so planning of local services, and transportation to employment in old parts of the city were critical. One of the city-planners' tasks was to ensure that the public buildings were built to cover the microdistrict's territory in accordance with the norms. Typical public service structures include secondary schools, pre-school establishments (usually combined kindergarten and nursery), grocery stores, personal service shops, cafeterias, clubs, playgrounds, and building maintenance offices, as well as a number of specialized shops. The exact number of buildings of each type depended on the distance requirement and the microdistrict's population density and was determined by means of certain per capita standards.

== History ==
=== 1920s–1950s ===
The history of microdistricts as an urban planning concept dates back to the 1920s, when the Soviet Union underwent rapid urbanization. Under the Soviet urban planning ideologies of the 1920s, residential complexes—compact territories with residential dwellings, schools, shops, entertainment facilities, and green spaces—started to prevail in urban planning practice, as they allowed for more careful and efficient planning of the rapid urban expansion. These complexes were seen as an opportunity to build a collective society, an environment suitable and necessary for the new way of life.

In the 1930s, residential complexes grew in size, covering territories of up to five to six hectares. A system of building residential complexes was gradually replaced with a concept of a city block. Such blocks generally comprised residential buildings along the perimeter, and residential buildings intermingled with public service buildings on the interior. However, it proved unfeasible to provide all public services within every city block, due to the latter's relatively compact size; it was not unusual to have a school, a kindergarten, or a store serving the population of several blocks, which were often separated by major motor roads. The system of the city block also required a developed network of roads, thus increasing the maintenance and construction costs and complicating the organization of public transportation.

The 1940s and 1950s saw further enlargement and grouping of the city blocks. However, new construction was based on the same principles as in the previous decades, and could not keep up with the increasing housing demand. Labor-intensive industrialization of the country demanded ever more workers, which was hard to achieve with housing accommodation lacking.

=== 1950s–1990s ===
Soviet authorities revisited issues of urban planning in the mid-1950s. The new urban planning concept was built on the idea of residential districts (with 10,000–30,000 inhabitants each), consisting of several microdistricts (with 8,000–12,000 inhabitants each), which in their turn comprised several residential complexes (with 1,000–1,500 inhabitants each). In larger cities, residential districts were grouped into urban zones, the population of which could reach one million.

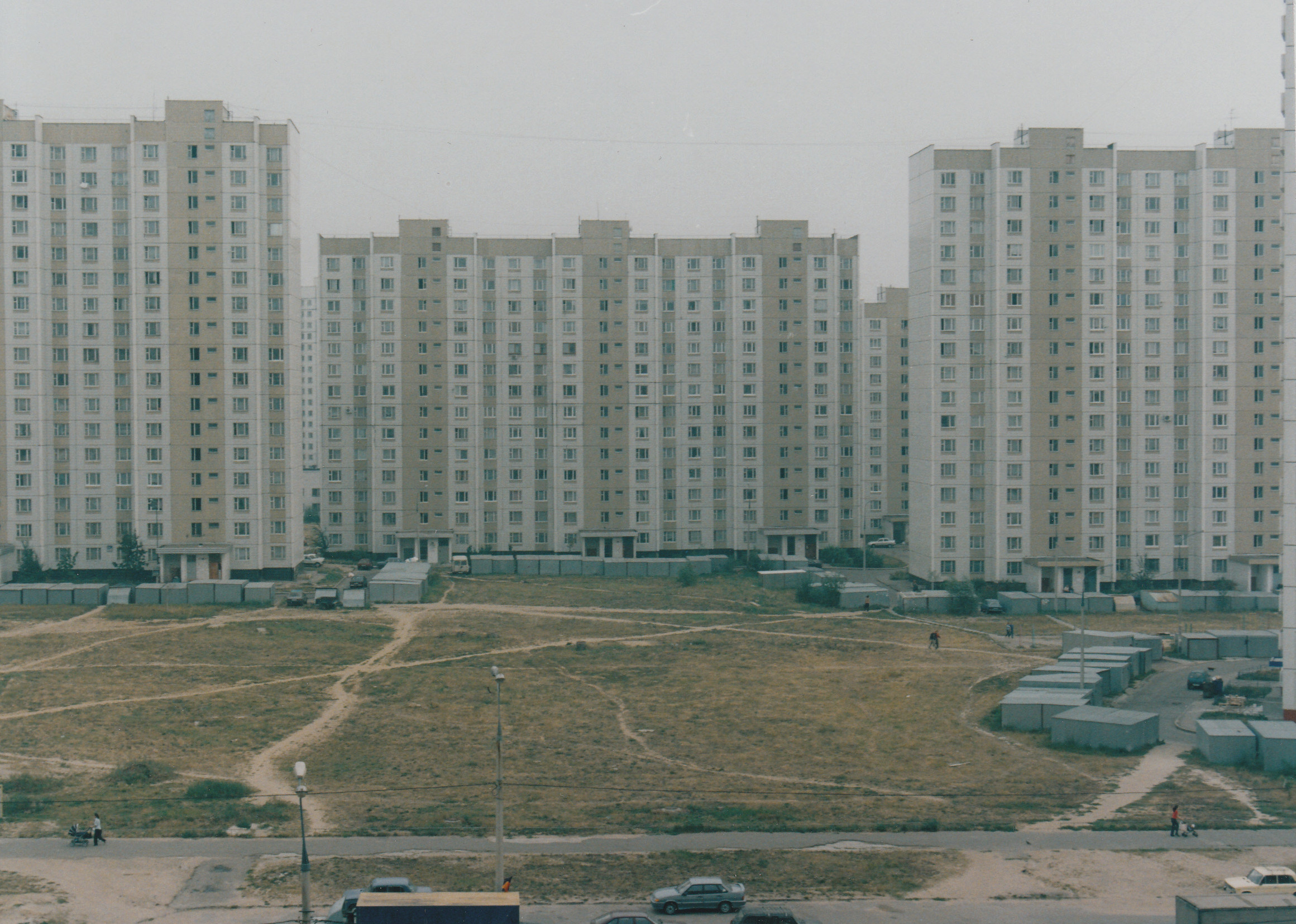
Standardized buildings in Moscow

Each microdistrict provided the people with facilities needed on a daily basis, whereas services in lesser demand were available on the residential-district level. This concept was backed up with the reorganization of the Soviet construction industry—panel-block apartment buildings became widespread as they allowed for fast, although often low-quality, construction, reduced costs, and economies of scale. The whole construction process became simplified and standardized, leading to the erection of the rows and rows of faceless grey rectangular apartment buildings which now prevail in every city and town of the countries of the former Soviet Union. Such a drastic reduction in building costs was necessary because, after World War II, there was a significant deficit in housing caused by the destruction of infrastructure in the Soviet Union during the war, with many major cities being completely destroyed and their buildings becoming unusable.

Humorous insights into the potential consequences of living in such a bland and repetitive atmosphere appear in the hugely popular Mosfilm production The Irony of Fate (1976).

== China ==
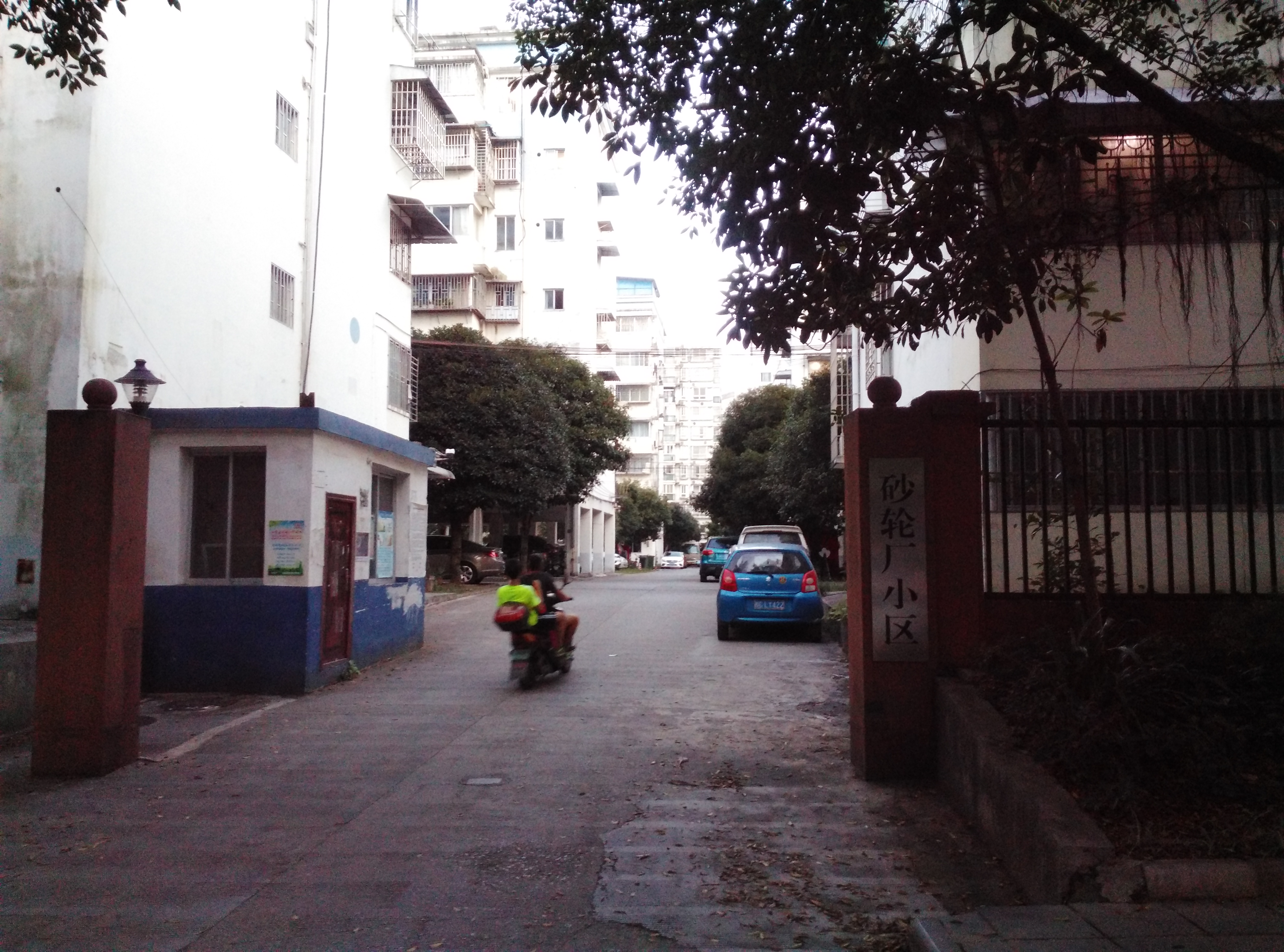
Entrance to a xiaoqu with a guardpost

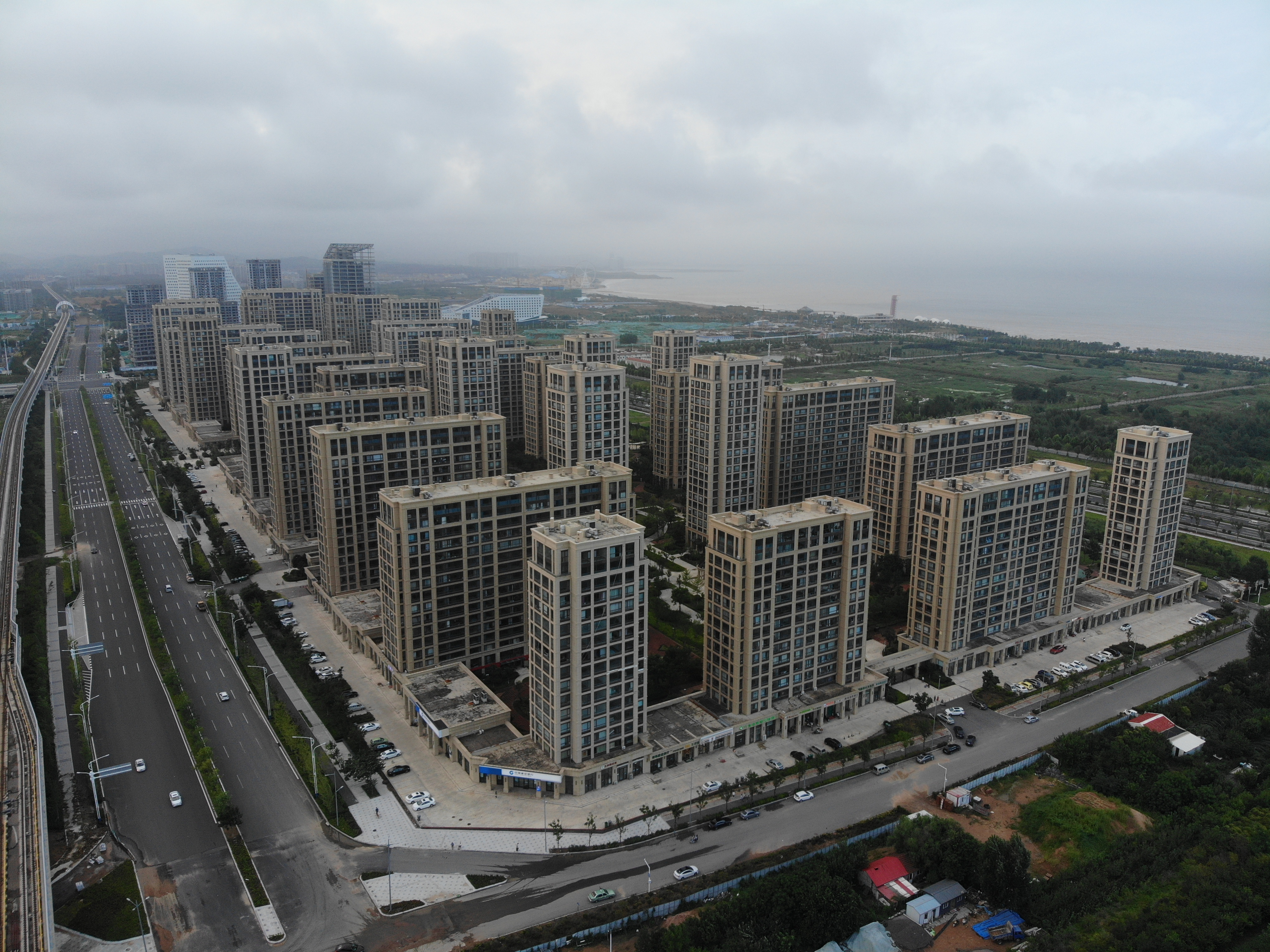
Modern xiaoqu in Qingdao

In China, this type of neighbourhood unit is known as xiaoqu (Chinese: 小区; pinyin: xiǎoqū). First built in the 1980s in Jinan, Tianjin, and Wuxi, preceding the reform and opening up, they were very similar to the concept as known in the Soviet Union, and are considered to be an evolution of the work unit (单位; dānwèi). Xiaoqu similarly promoted a sense of community among the inhabitants.

After the economy was opened up more for commercial real estate developers, xiaoqu continued to be built in recent decades, but evolved in several ways such as differentiation in luxury, safety and available services. The apartments are owned by the inhabitants, and the xiaoqu is often enclosed by a wall, with the entrance gate being guarded. The xiaoqu often also have their own government representatives and property managers. The number of residents can vary greatly depending on the kind of xiaoqu, with Beijing's Tiantongyuan suburb having more than 700,000 residents as of 2019, whereas other xiaoqu only consist of one building housing a few hundred residents.

2016 State Council guidelines called for opening up private roads in xiaoqu, and building smaller scale xiaoqu, to allow a finer road network in cities.

== See also ==
- 15-minute city
- Falowiec
- Gated community
- High-rise building
- Housing estate
- Kommunalka
- Neighbourhood
  - Neighbourhood unit
- Panelák, Panelház, Plattenbau
- Urban planning in communist countries

== Sources ==
- Great Soviet Encyclopedia, entry on "микрорайон"
- (in Russian) "Строительные нормы и правила. Градостроительство. Планировка и застройка городских и сельских поселений", СНиП 2.07.01—89, 1989 — Construction Rules and Regulations. City-Planning. Planning and Development of Urban and Rural Settlements, SNiP 2.07.01—89, 1989
- (in Russian) Н. С. Сапрыкина, "Основные градостроительные концепции и современные проблемы реконструкции жилой среды середины 1950-х — 1960-х гг. — N. S. Saprykina, Principal city-town concepts and modern problems of reconstruction of the mid-1950s—1960s residential environments
