= Tiantongyuannan Subdistrict =

Subdistrict located in Beijing, China

Tiantongyuannan Subdistrict 天通苑南街道
- Subdistrict
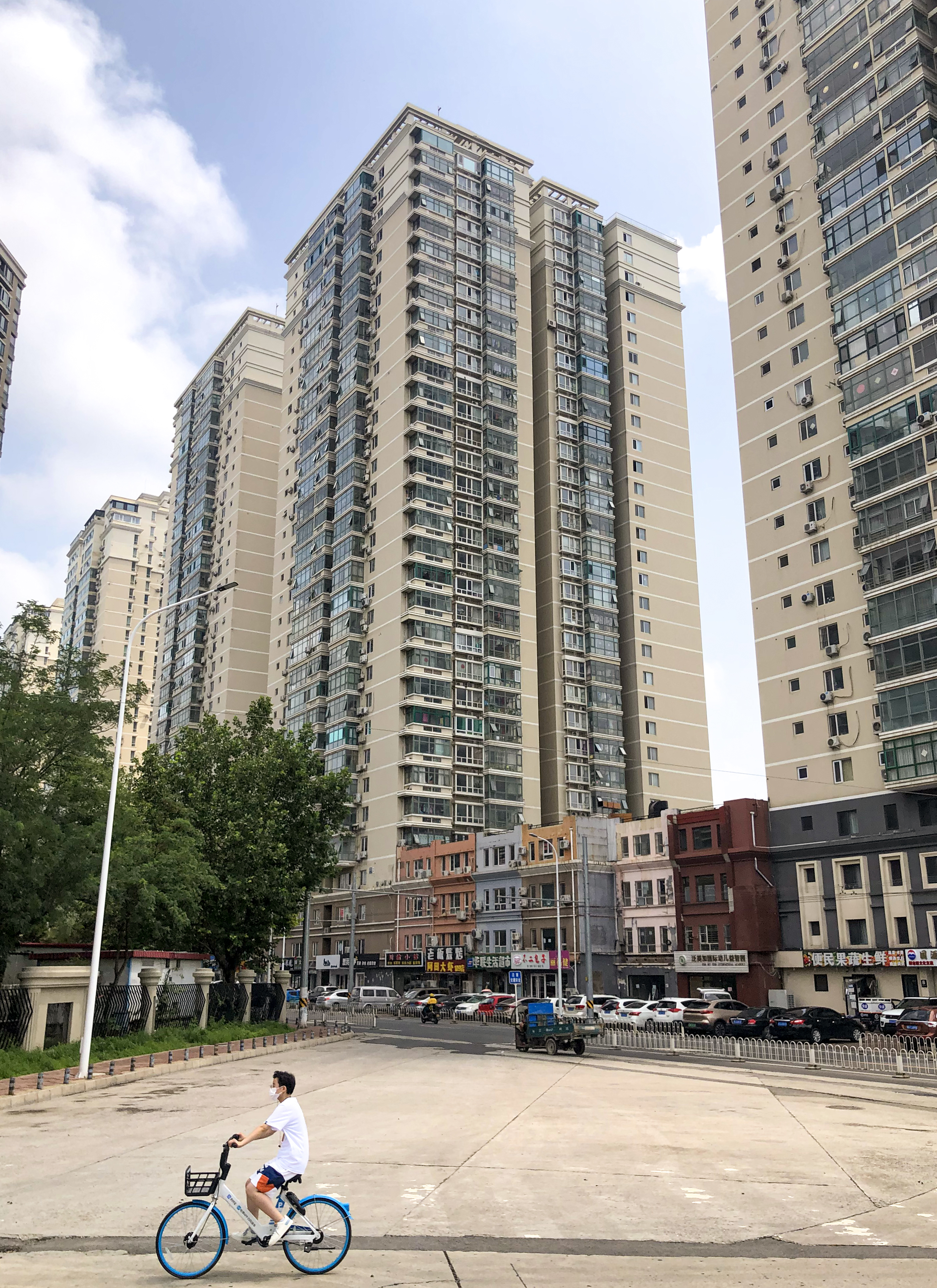
- Residential Buildings in Phase I of Tiantong Dongyuan, 2021

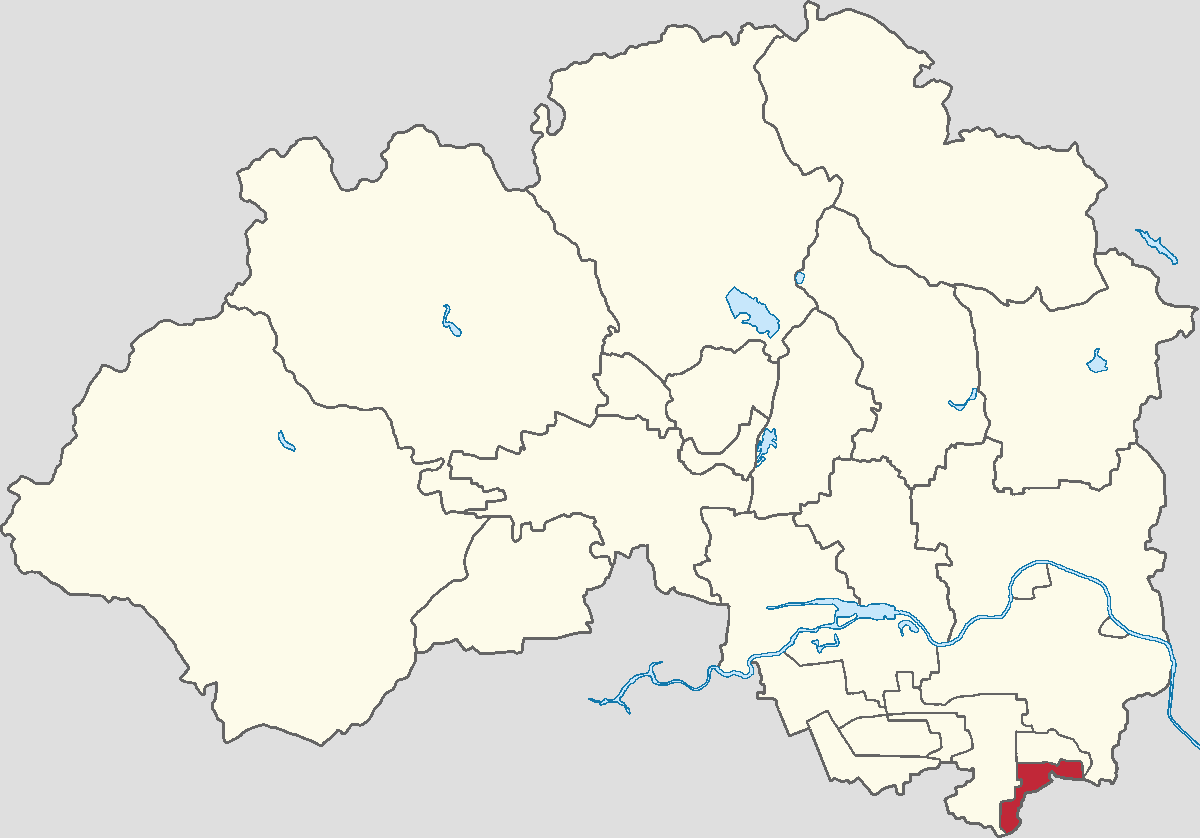
- Location of Tiantongyuannan Subdistrict within Changping District

- Location within Beijing Location within China
- Coordinates: 40°04′02″N 116°23′52″E
- Country: China
- Municipality: Beijing
- District: Changping
- Village-level Divisions: 15 communities 1 villages

Area
  - Total: 5.44 km^{2} (2.10 sq mi)
- Elevation: 38 m (125 ft)

Population (2020)
  - Total: 116,529
  - Density: 21,400/km^{2} (55,500/sq mi)
- Time zone: UTC+8 (China Standard)
- Postal code: 102218
- Area code: 010

Tiantongyuannan Subdistrict (Chinese: 天通苑南街道; pinyin: Tiāntōngyuànnán Jiēdào) is a subdistrict on the southern side of Changping District, Beijing, China. It borders Tiantongyuanbei Subdistrict in the north and east, Laiguangying Township and Aoyuncun Subdistrict in the south, Dongsheng and Dongxiaokou Towns in the west. Its population was 116,529 as of 2020.

The subdistrict was created in 2012. It took its name from Tiantongyuan, the community that it makes up the southern part of.

== Administrative divisions ==
As of 2021, Tiantongyuannan Subdistrict was composed of 16 subdivisions, of which 15 were communities, and 1 was a village:

Administrative division code	Subdivision names	Name transliteration	Type
110114009001	东辰	Dongchen	Community
110114009002	佳运园	Jiayunyuan	Community
110114009003	天通苑第二	Tiantongyuan Di'er	Community
110114009004	天通西苑第一	Tiantong Xiyuan Diyi	Community
110114009005	天通东苑第一	Tiantong Dongyuan Diyi	Community
110114009006	天通东苑第二	Tiantong Dongyuan Di'er	Community
110114009007	天通苑第一	Tiantongyuan Diyi	Community
110114009008	嘉诚花园	Jiacheng Huayuan	Community
110114009009	清水园	Qingshuiyuan	Community
110114009010	北方明珠	Beifang Mingzhu	Community
110114009011	天通东苑第四	Tiantong Dongyuan Disi	Community
110114009012	顶秀清溪	Dingxiu Qingxi	Community
110114009013	奥北中心	Aobei Zhongxin	Community
110114009014	溪城珑原	Xicheng Longyuan	Community
110114009015	正辰中心	Zhengchen Zhongxin	Community
110114009201	陈营	Chenying	Village

== Gallery ==
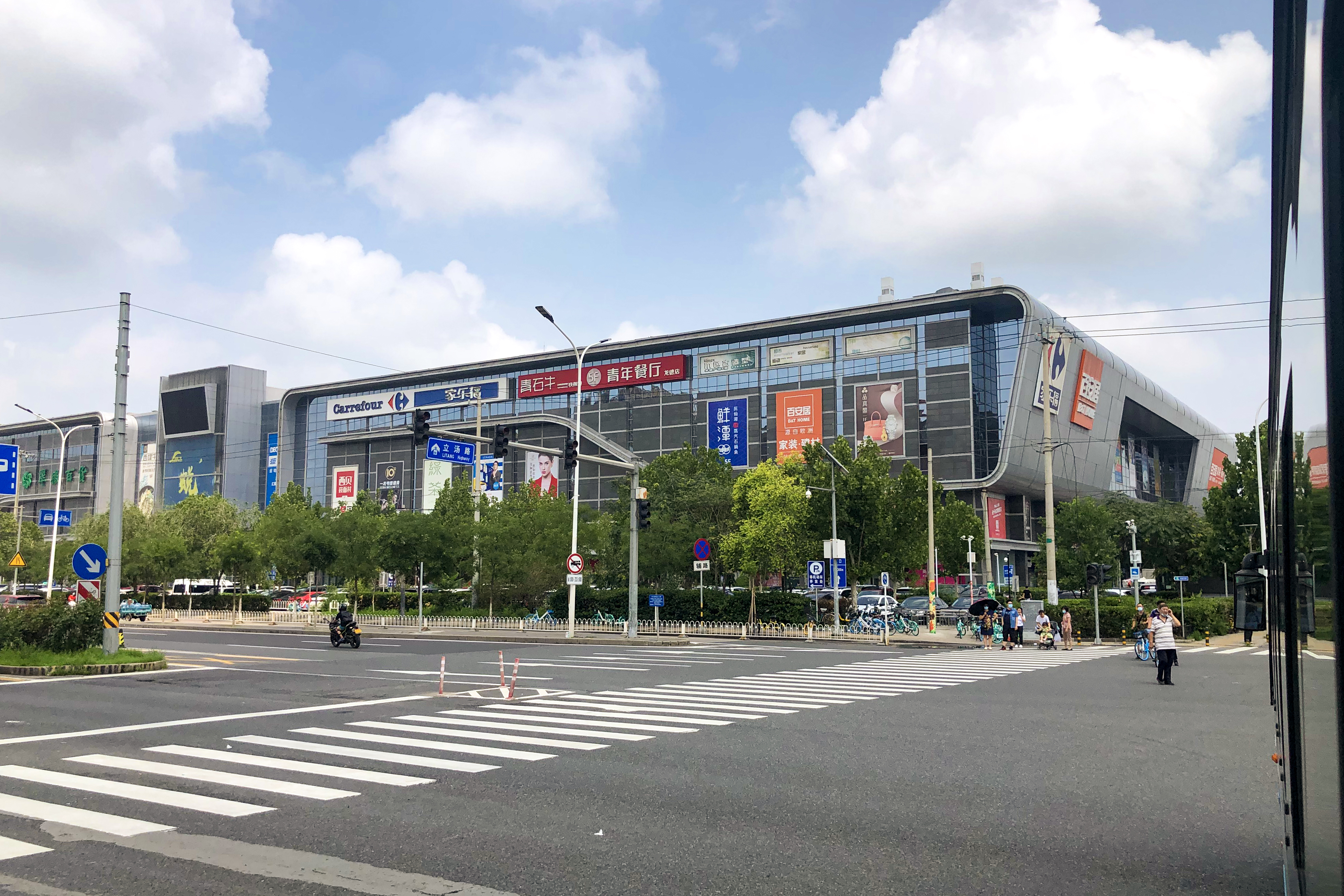
Longde Plaza south of the subdistrict, 2021

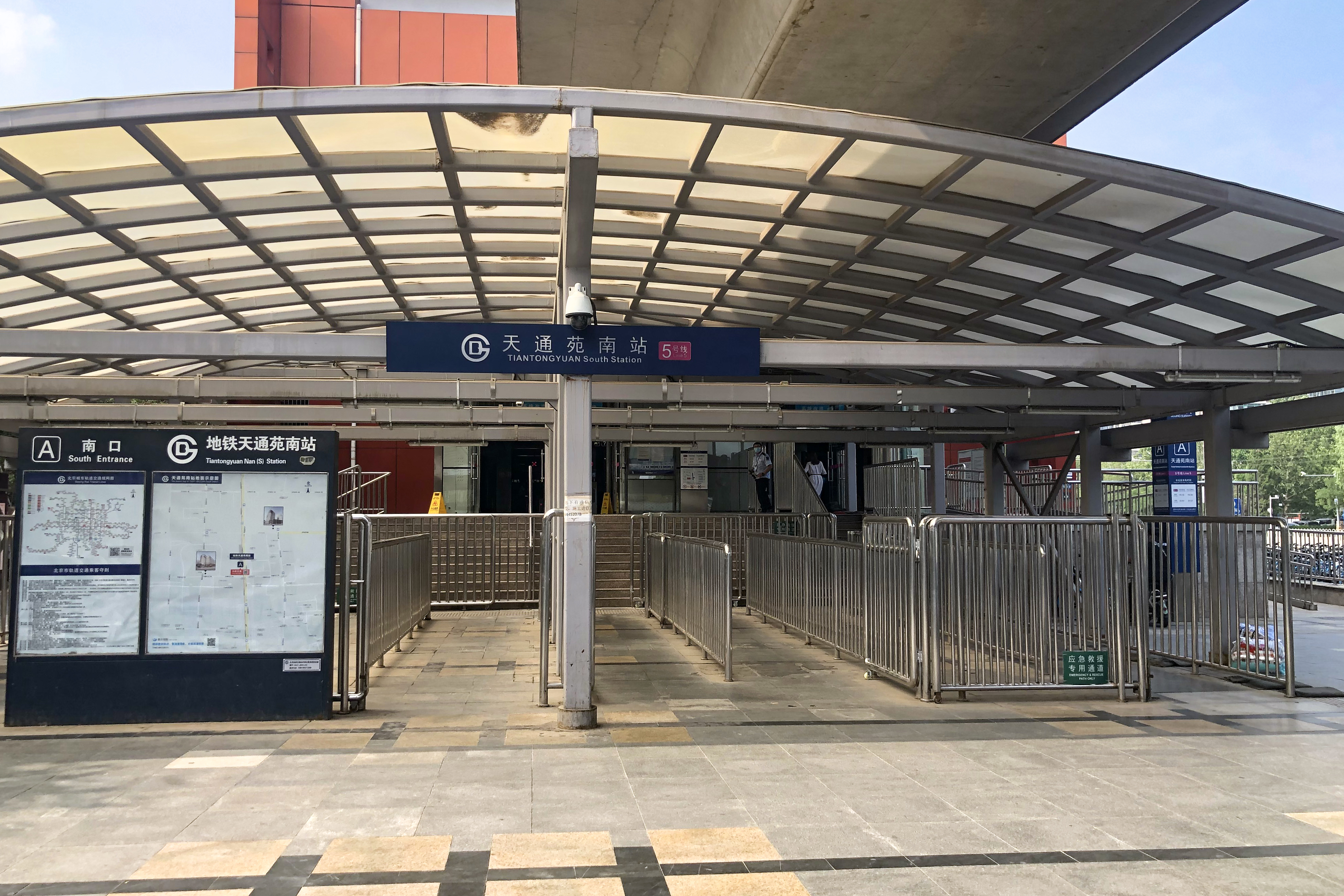
Tiantongyuannan Station, 2021

== See also ==
- List of township-level divisions of Beijing
