= Tiantongyuanbei Subdistrict =

Tiantongyuanbei Subdistrict 天通苑北街道
- Subdistrict
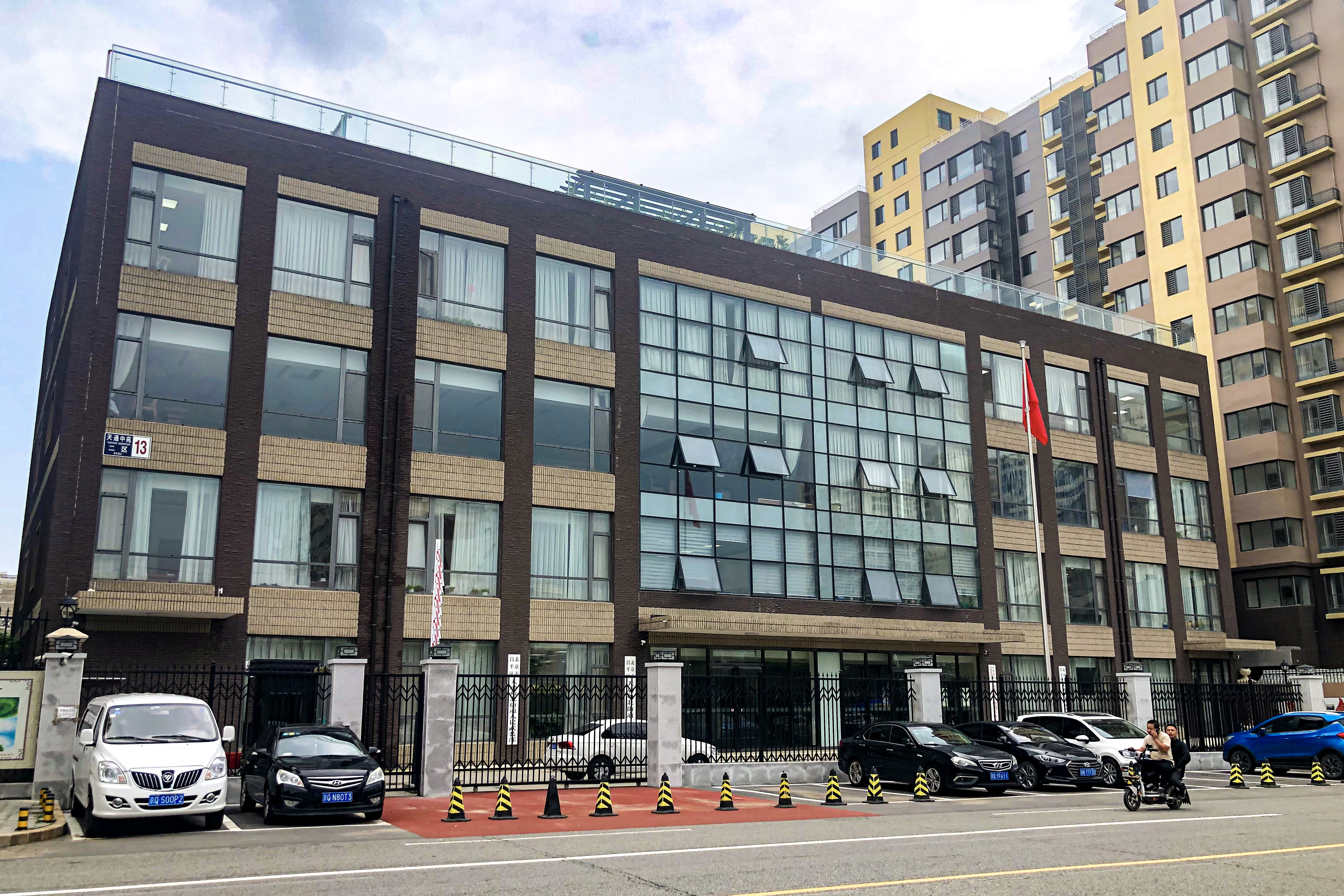
- Government building of Tiantongyuanbei Subdistrict

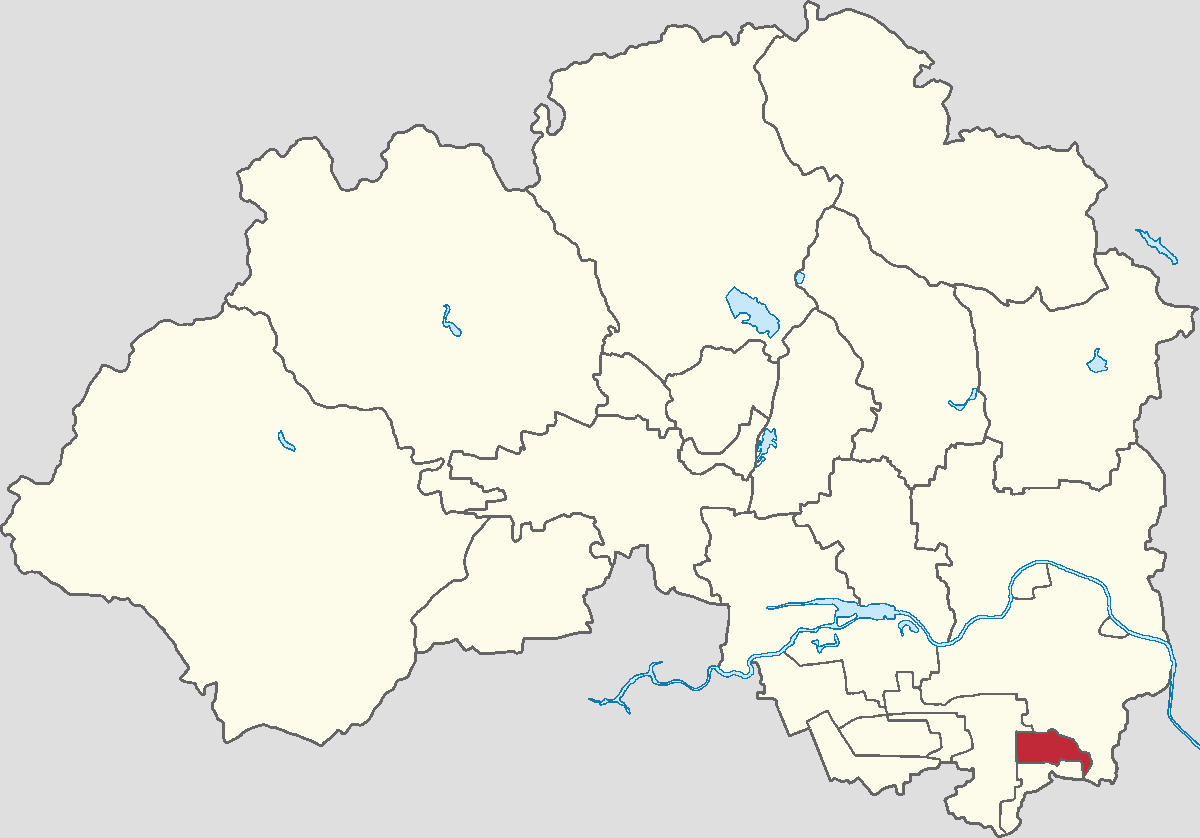
- Location of Tiantongyuanbei Subdistrict within Changping District

- Location within Beijing Location within China
- Coordinates: 40°04′14″N 116°24′39″E
- Country: China
- Municipality: Beijing
- District: Changping
- Village-level Divisions: 13 communities 3 villages

Area
  - Total: 4.82 km^{2} (1.86 sq mi)
- Elevation: 38 m (125 ft)

Population (2020)
  - Total: 142,707
  - Density: 29,600/km^{2} (76,700/sq mi)
- Time zone: UTC+8 (China Standard)
- Postal code: 102218
- Area code: 010

Tiantongyuanbei Subdistrict (Chinese: 天通苑北街道; pinyin: Tiāntōngyuànběi Jiēdào) is a subdistrict situated on the southeastern corner of Changping District, Beijing, China. It shares border with Beiqijia Town in the north and east, Laiguangying Township and Tiantongyuannan Subdistrict in the south, and Dongxiaokou Area in the west. In the year 2020, it had 142,707 people residing within its borders.

The subdistrict was created in 2012 from part of Dongxiaokou Area. It received the name Tiantongyuanbei for being the north part of Tiantongyuan, a residential community developed in 1999.

== Administrative divisions ==
As of 2021, Tiantongyuanbei Subdistrict consisted of 16 subdivisions, more specifically 13 communities and 3villages:

Administrative division code	Subdivision names	Name transliteration	Type
110114008001	天通东苑第三	Tiantong Dongyuan Disan	Community
110114008002	天通西苑第二	Tiantong Xiyuan Di'er	Community
110114008003	天通西苑第三	Tiantong Xiyuan Disan	Community
110114008004	天通西苑第四	Tiantong Xiyuan Disi	Community
110114008007	天通北苑第三	Tiantong Beiyuan Disan	Community
110114008008	天通中苑第一	Tiantong Zhongyuan Diyi	Community
110114008009	太平家园	Tianping Jiayuan	Community
110114008010	天通中苑第二	Tiantong Zhongyuan Di'er	Community
110114008011	天通中苑第三	Tiantong Zhongyuan Disan	Community
110114008012	天通北苑第一东	Tiantong Beiyuan Diyi Dong	Community
110114008013	天通北苑第一西	Tiantong Beiyuan Diyi Xi	Community
110114008014	天通北苑第二东	Tiantong Beiyuan Di'er Dong	Community
110114008015	天通北苑第二西	Tiantong Beiyuan Di'er Xi	Community
110114008201	太平庄	Taipingzhuang	Village
110114008202	白坊	Baifang	Village
110114008203	狮子营	Shiziying	Village

== Gallery ==
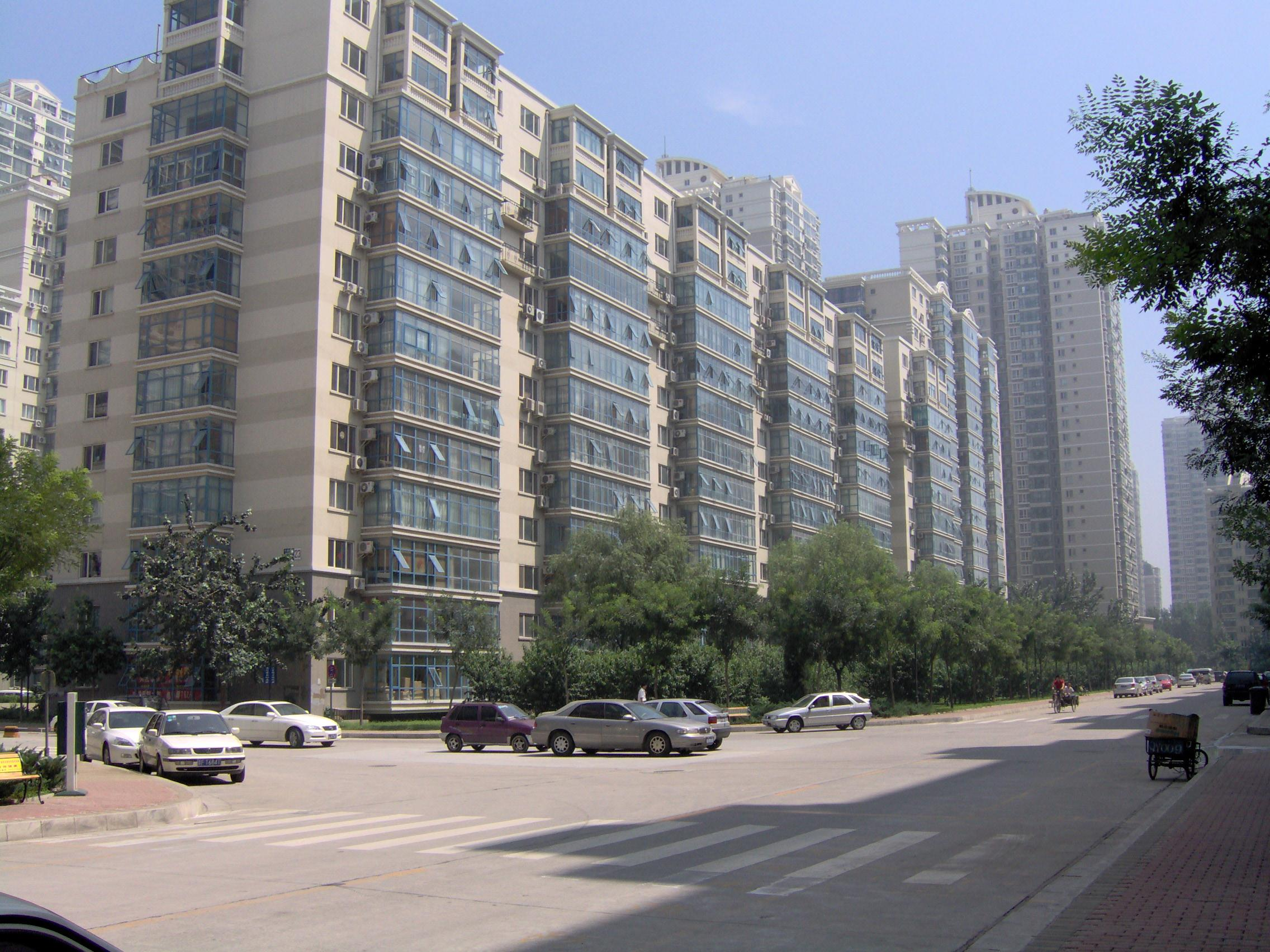
Taipingzhuang Central Second Street in Tiantongyuan, 2008

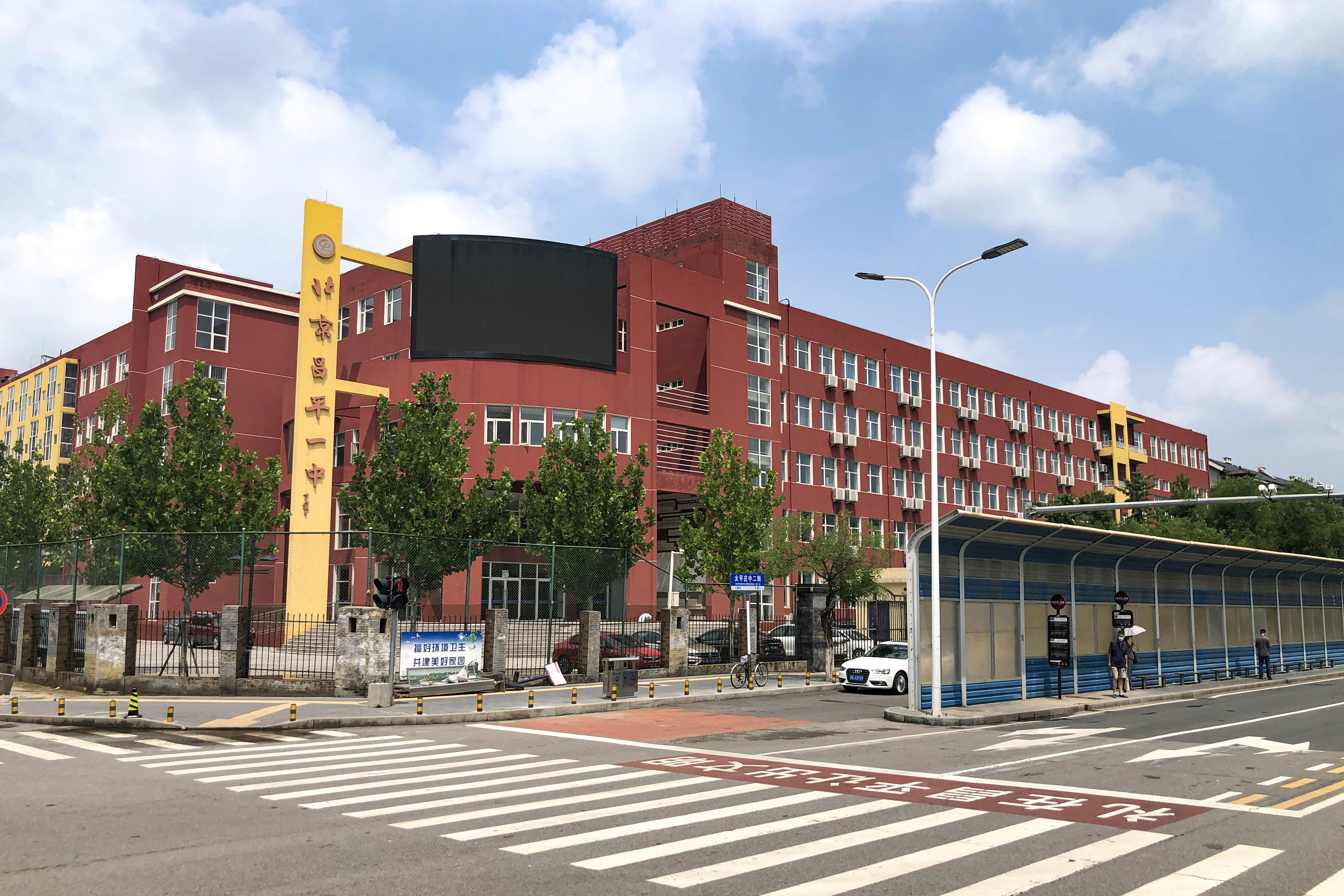
Tiantongyuan campus of Changping No.1 Middle School, 2021

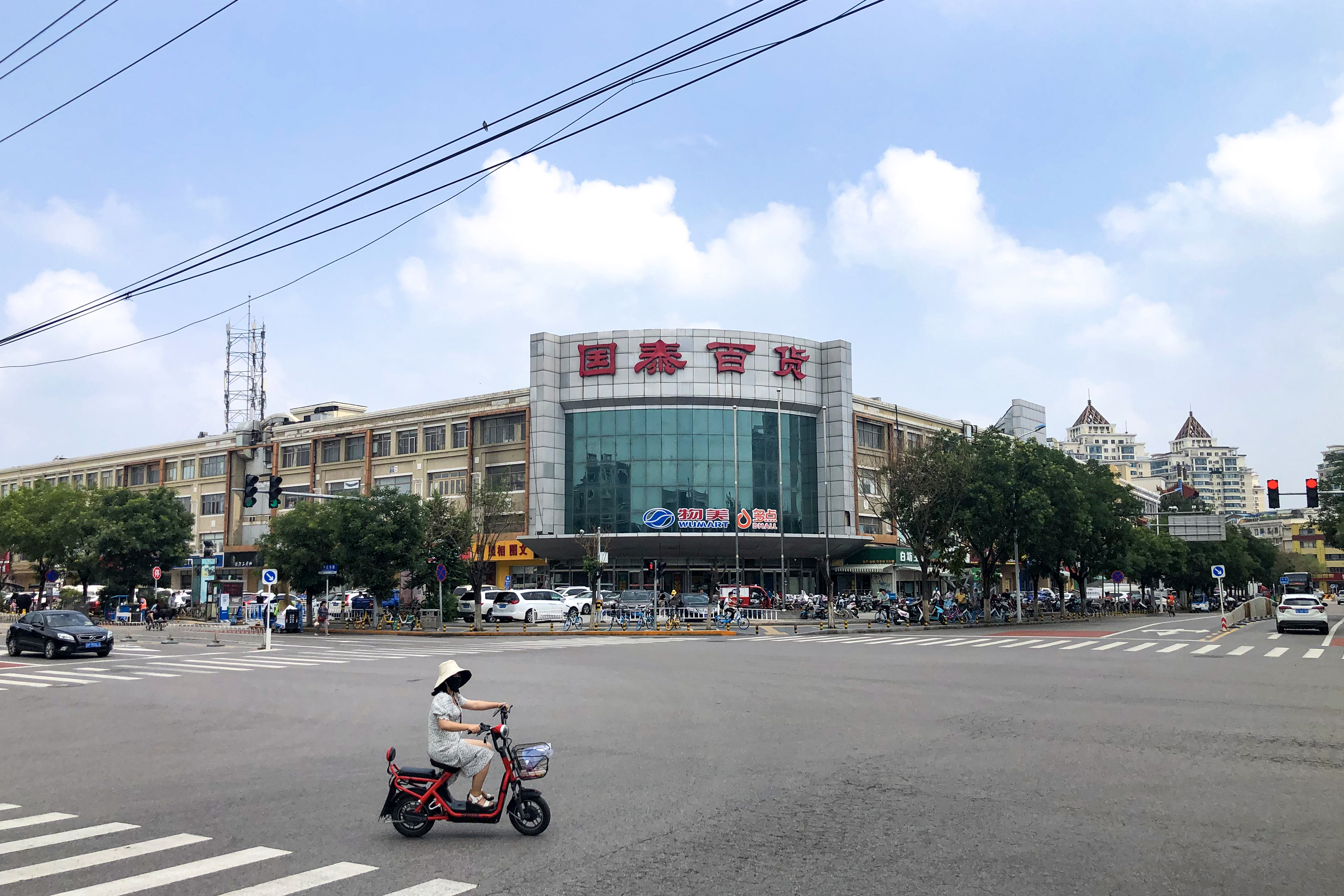
Guotai Department Store on the east of the subdistrict, 2021

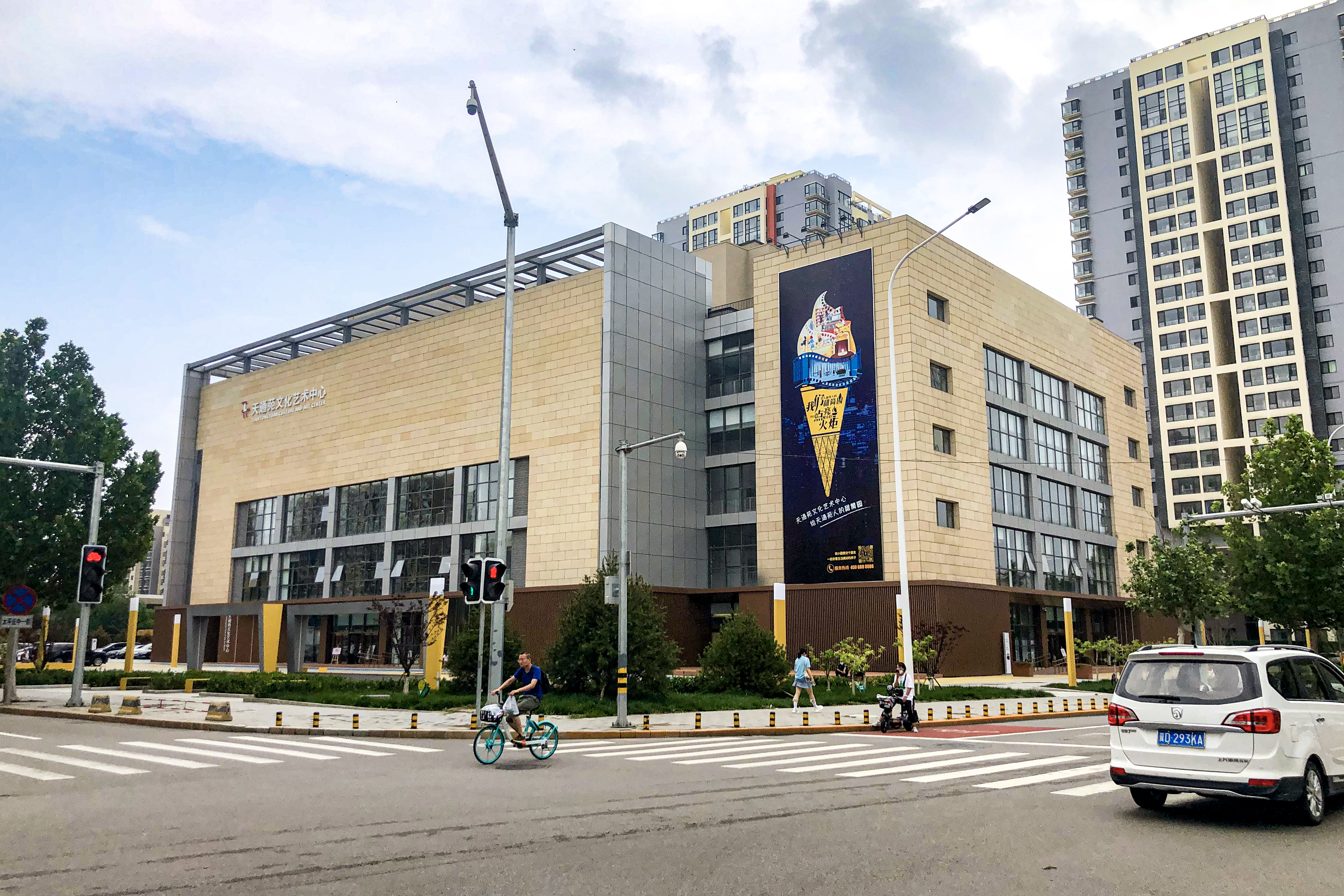
Tiantongyuan Culture and Art Center, 2021

== See also ==
- List of township-level divisions of Beijing
