= Canton of Le Mée-sur-Seine =

Le Mée-sur-Seine
- Former canton
- Interactive map of Le Mée-sur-Seine
- Country: France
- Region: Île-de-France
- Department: Seine-et-Marne
- No. of communes: {{{nbcomm}}}
- Disbanded: 2015
- Area: 37.93 km^{2} (14.64 sq mi)
- Population (2012): 38,506
  - Density: 1,015/km^{2} (2,629/sq mi)

The canton of Le Mée-sur-Seine is a French former administrative division, located in the Seine-et-Marne département, in Île-de-France région. It was disbanded following the French canton reorganisation which came into effect in March 2015. It consisted of 5 communes, which joined the canton of Savigny-le-Temple in 2015.

== Demographics ==
Historical population
Year	Pop.	±%
1999	37,725	—
2006	36,510	−3.2%
2012	38,506	+5.5%

== Composition ==
The canton of Le Mée-sur-Seine was composed of 5 communes:

- Boissettes
- Boissise-la-Bertrand
- Cesson
- Le Mée-sur-Seine
- Vert-Saint-Denis

== Election results ==
List of the conseillers generaux
Election	Identity	Party
2004	Gérard Bernheim	Socialist
1998	Gérard Bernheim	Socialist
1993	René André	Union pour la démocratie française

== See also ==
- Cantons of the Seine-et-Marne department
- Communes of the Seine-et-Marne department
