= Villemeneux =

- Hamlet
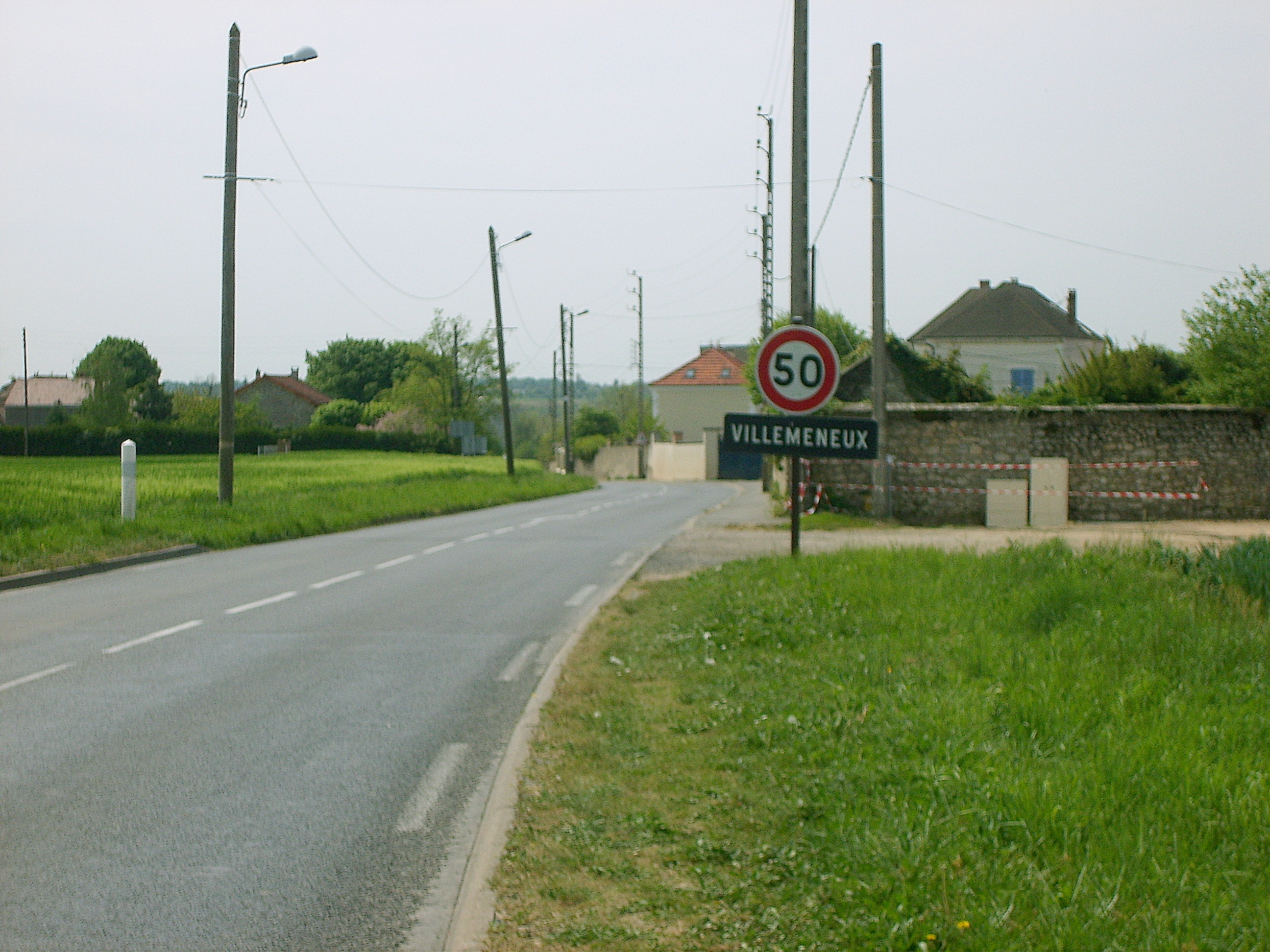
- Villemeneux

- Location within France
- Coordinates: 48°40′40″N 2°35′40″E
- Country: France
- Region: Île-de-France
- Department: Seine-et-Marne
- Arrondissement: Melun
- Canton: Combs-la-Ville
- Commune: Brie-Comte-Robert
- Postal Code: 77170
- INSEE code: 77053

Villemeneux is a hamlet located on the territory of the commune of Brie-Comte-Robert, in Seine-et-Marne, France.

== Localization ==
Villemeneux is located at the medium of the agricultural fields, very close to Combs-la-Ville and the town of Brie-Comte-Robert.

Here is a warehouse of buses, which serve these nearby cities.

== Construction ==
The town of increasing Brie-Comte-Robert and the trade increase in a number.

Consequently the population of Villemeneux increases and there are more and more houses in construction and of restoration of old farms and barns.

== Agriculture ==
Villemeneux is surrounded of fields of Colza...; There are still farms and the main thing activity of the locality is agriculture.
