= Sénart =

New town in Île-de-France, France

Coordinates: 48°37′N 2°33′E

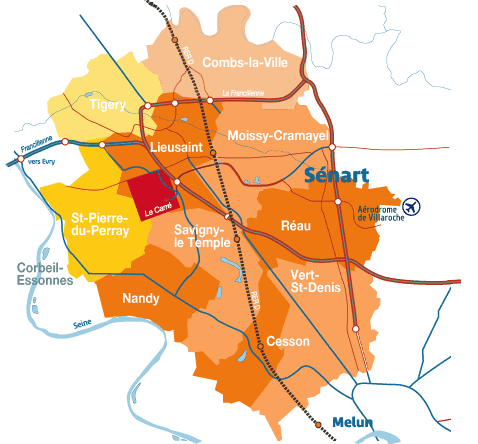
A map of the ten communes forming the new town of Sénart

Sénart (French pronunciation: [senaʁ]; formerly Melun-Sénart) is a new town in southern Île-de-France, covering parts of the departments of Seine-et-Marne and Essonne. It was named after the forest of Sénart. In 1973 the government created the établissement public d'aménagement (a type of établissement public à caractère industriel et commercial) to realise the new town, after planning had begun in the 1960s.

== Communes ==
- Combs-la-Ville
- Réau
- Moissy-Cramayel
- Cesson
- Lieusaint
- Nandy
- Savigny-le-Temple
- Vert-Saint-Denis
- Saint-Pierre-du-Perray
- Tigery

== Education ==
- Institut catholique d'arts et métiers
