= Hôtel de Ville, Savigny-le-Temple =

Town hall in Savigny-le-Temple, France

Hôtel de Ville
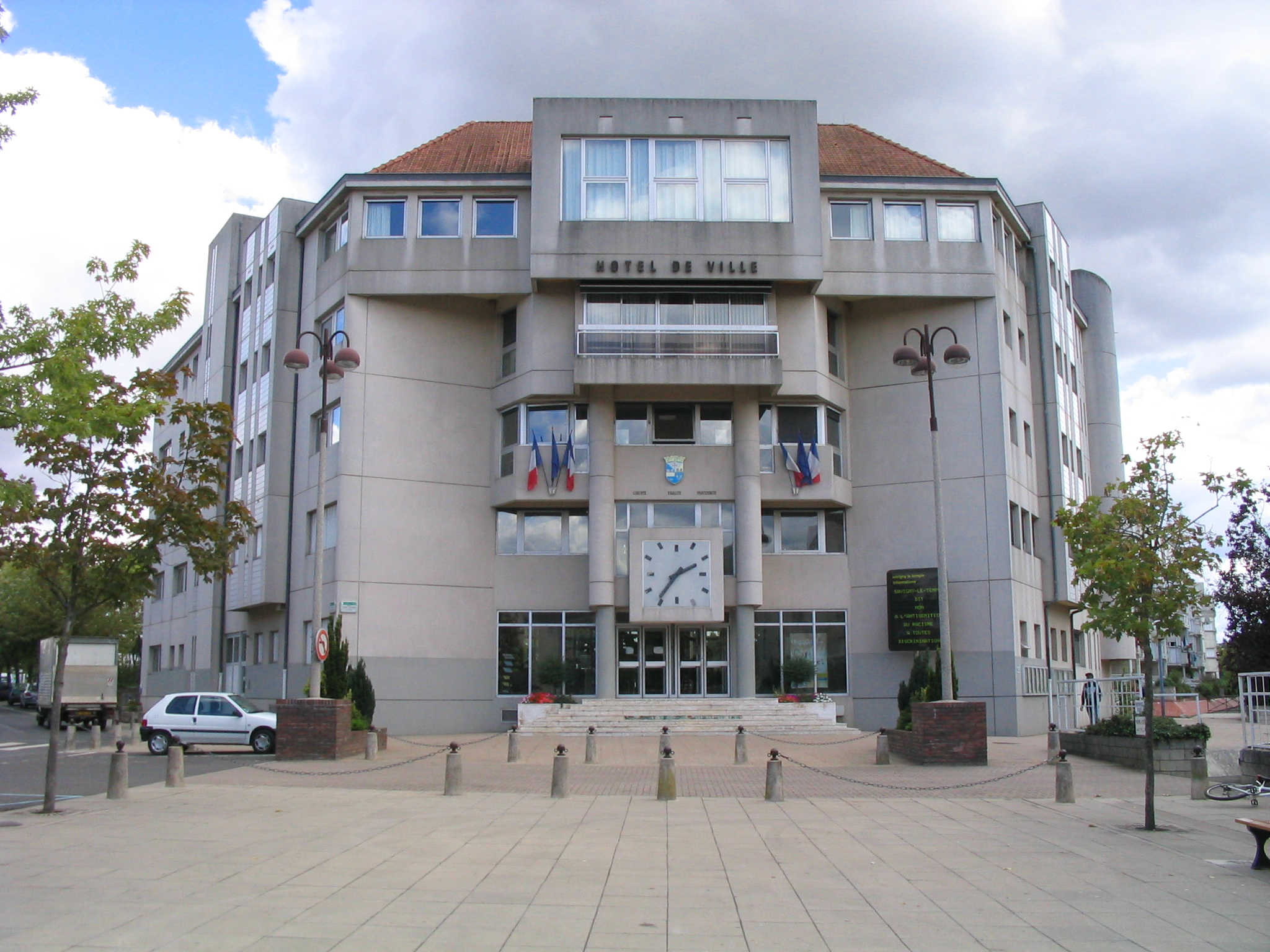
- The main frontage of the Hôtel de Ville in August 2006
- Interactive map of the Hôtel de Ville area

General information
- Type: City hall
- Architectural style: Modern style
- Location: Savigny-le-Temple, France
- Coordinates: 48.5959°N 2.5805°E
- Completed: 1985

The Hôtel de Ville (French pronunciation: [otɛl də vil], City Hall) is a municipal building in Savigny-le-Temple, Seine-et-Marne in the south-eastern suburbs of Paris, standing on Place François Mitterrand.

== History ==
Following the French Revolution, the town council initially met in the house of the mayor at the time. This arrangement continued until 1842 when it established a combined town hall and school in the home of the schoolteacher, Jean-Etienne Hanat.

After the Second World War, the council decided to acquire a building for use as a dedicated town hall. The building they selected was just to the west of the Church of Saint-Germain d'Auxerre. The building, which was designed in the neoclassical style and built in ashlar stone, was acquired from Sieur Mequer in 1948. The design involved a symmetrical main frontage of three bays facing onto Place de l'Église. The central bay featured a square headed doorway with a prominent glass canopy. The other bays on the ground floor and all the bays on the first floor were fenestrated by casement windows. There was a bi-partite dormer window above the central bay. After the building was no longer required for municipal use it became a town hall annex before being sold by the council and then converted for use as a notary's office in 2019.

Following significant population growth, largely around the new town of Sénart, the council decided to commission a modern town hall. The site they selected was in the growing Grange-du-Bois district to the north of the old town. The new building was designed in the modern style, built in concrete and glass with grey cladding and was officially opened by the Minister of State for Planning and Regional Development, Gaston Defferre, in November 1985.

The design involved a symmetrical main frontage of three bays facing onto Place François Mitterrand. The central bay featured a short flight of steps leading up to a glass door. There was a square clock above the doorway and casement windows on the first, second and third floors. The central bay was flanked, on the first three floors, by round-fronted piers supporting a balcony on the floor above and, on the second floor, the central bay was additionally flanked by oriel windows. The outer bays were blind and canted back on the first four floors. The fifth floor featured a wide box which was projected forward and fenestrated by a plate glass window. Internally, the principal room was the Salle du Conseil (council chamber).

An exhibition of the works of the works of the Japanese-French artist, Tetsuo Harada, took place in the town hall in 1987.

On the night of 3 September 2006, arsonists entered the building through a window and initiated a fire on the ground floor causing extensive damage to the furniture, fittings and computer equipment as well as the building fabric. A major programme of repair works was subsequently undertaken to repair the damage caused by the fire and to refurbish dilapidated parts of the building. The works were completed at a cost of €2.5 million in November 2007.
