= Sukonnaya Sloboda (Kazan Metro) =

Kazan Metro Station

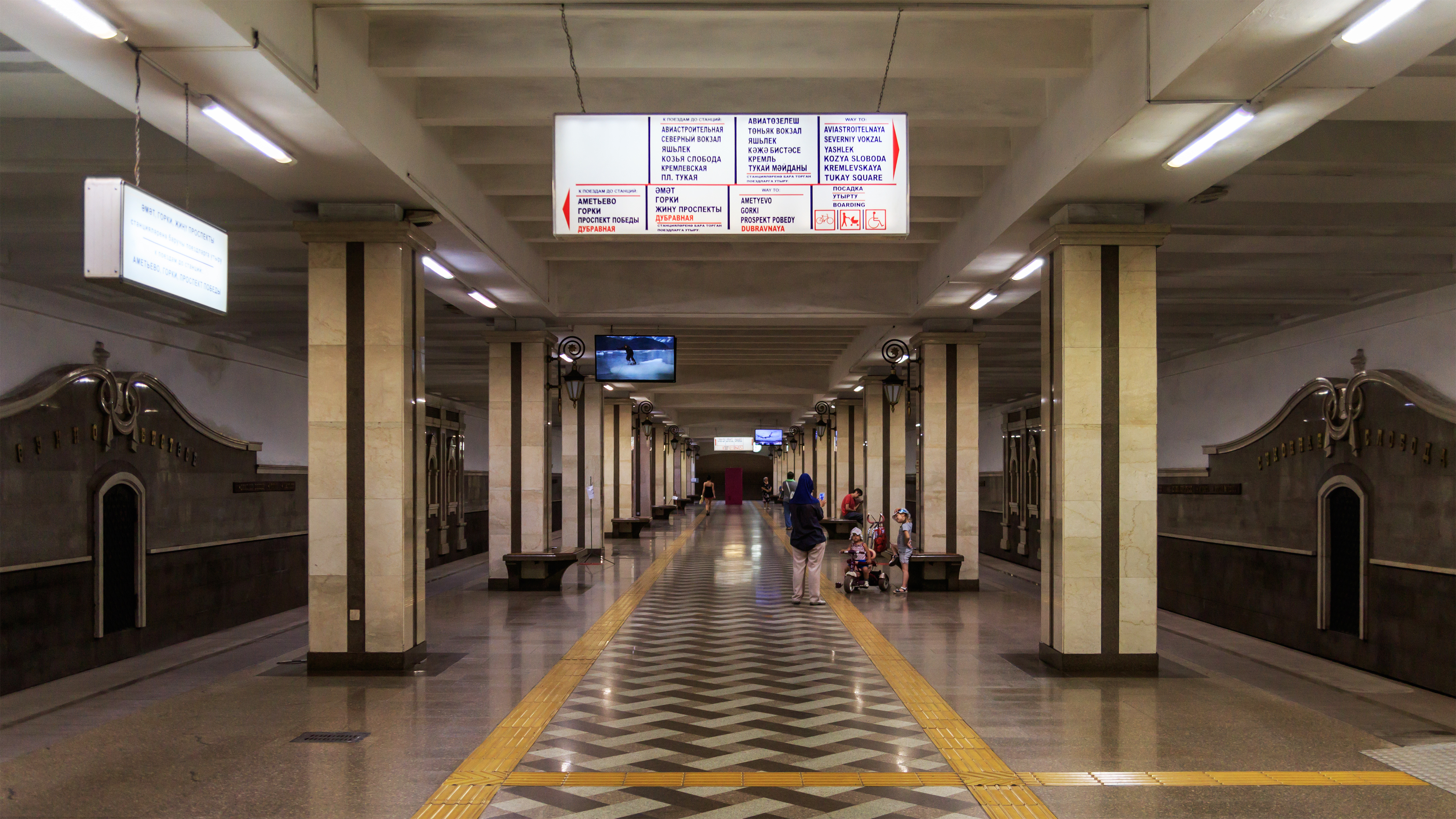

General information
- Coordinates: 55°46′36″N 49°08′36″E
- Owner: Kazan Metro
- Platforms: 1 Island platform
- Tracks: 2

History
- Opened: 27 August 2005

Services
Preceding station	Kazan Metro	Following station
Ploshchad Tukaya towards Aviastroitelnaya	First Line	Ametyevo towards Dubravnaya
Location

Sukonnaya Sloboda (Russian: Суконная Слобода) is a station on the Kazan Metro. Opened as part of the first stage of the system on 27 August 2005, the station is built to a typical pillar bi-span sub-surface design, with two parallel rows of 14 concrete pillars.

Designed by architects A. Mustafin, T. Ksenofontova and N. Muravyova, the station's theme features on Kazan's history as part of Tsardom of Russia, with three-tone colour gamma (white, beige and brown respectively Bottichino marble, and Krutinsky and Dzhiltau-Nadezhda granites) and carefully selected decorations, complete with its setting under the historic cotton merchant row (Sloboda), on the path of the old Nogay track to the Golden Horde.

The Baroque influences of the 17th century are seen on the walls of the station where the three-tone marble is filled with two sets of pilasters, one in shape of a set of windows (with dark meshes and white frames) and the other in shape of an epaulet. The pillars themselves are faced with the three-tone marble and granite combination. Every second pillar also has a hinged lamp and a wooden bench.

The platform floor is laid with polished granite of different tones arranged in a geometrical ornament artwork. The ceiling is a monolithic concrete, with deep cessons that are covered with matted white glass which forms the main lighting of the station.

The station contains two vestibules underground vestibules, the northern one offering an exit to the Peterburgskaya Street, whilst the southern one is located near the intersection between Peterburgskaya and Esperanto street. In perspective it has been suggested to create a set of subways on the intersection. The interior aesthetics of both vestibules repeat that of the station.
