= Lucie Faure =

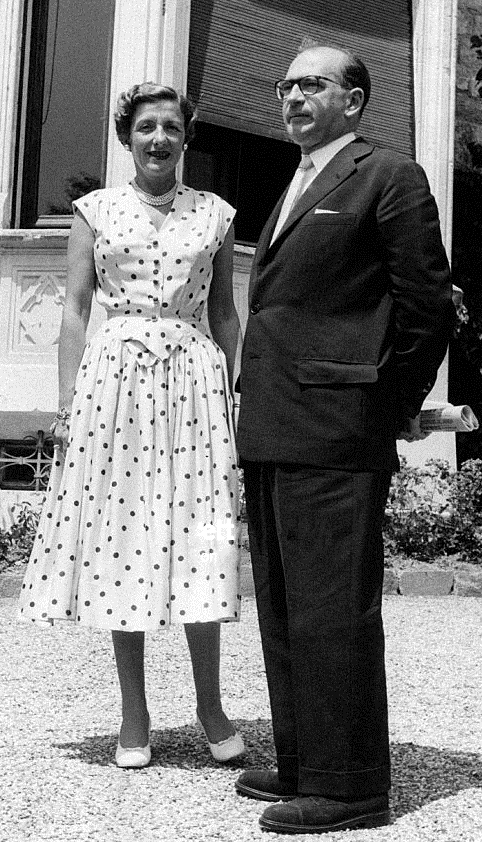
- Lucie and Edgar Faure in 1955
- Born: 6 July 1908; Paris
- Died: 25 September 1977 (aged 69); Boissise-la-Bertrand (Seine-et-Marne)
- Occupation: Writer

Lucie Faure, née Meyer (6 July 1908 – 25 September 1977) was a French woman of letters, novelist and literary review director.

== Early life ==
The daughter of a merchant of fabrics of Alsatian origin, she was the niece, on the maternal side, of Julien Cain, who was administrator general of the Bibliothèque nationale de France from 1930 to 1964.

In 1931, she married Edgar Faure, then a young lawyer.

== Second World War ==
A refugee with her husband and daughter in Tunisia in the autumn of 1942 and then in Algiers, after the American landing of 8 November, she was attached to the French Committee of National Liberation and organised the Institute of Slavic Studies at the University of Algiers.

It is also in Algiers that she created in 1943 with the writer Robert Aron the magazine La Nef, which would be the first to be published in Paris the day after the Libération of France and of which she assured the direction until her death. Numerous issues of La Nef were milestones, such as those devoted to contemporary political and social problems (the Algerian war, police, Americans, psychoanalysis, prostitution, women, Justice, advertising, opinion polls, freedoms etc.).

== Politics ==
Close to the milieu of the Paris intellectual left during the era of decolonization of North Africa, she assisted and advised her husband in his various political functions, generally defending positions more advanced than his own by avoiding placing herself on the front of the political scene. However, she accepted to succeed him in 1970 as mayor of Port-Lesney, in Jura.

== Woman of letters ==
The author of a Journal d'un voyage en Chine which drew attention (1958), she began a career as a novelist from the 1960s. Her eight novels (to which were added seven short stories in a posthumous work) reflect less her great familiarity with political circles than "her intimate curiosity about things of the heart" (B. Poirot-Delpech). The psychological complexity of the subjects tackled, such as delirious jealousy, suicide, parricide or ill-assumed homosexuality, was "compensated by an extreme concern for clarity and a kind of optimistic candor". A member of the jury of the Prix Medici since 1971, she exercised a great influence in the literary world of Paris.

== Death and legacy ==
She died in her property of Boissise-la-Bertrand (Seine-et-Marne). She is buried at Passy Cemetery in Paris.

She held the rank of commandeur of the Légion d'honneur.

== Bibliography ==
- 1958: Journal d'un voyage en Chine, Éditions Julliard
- 1961: Les Passions indécises, novel, Julliard
- 1963: Les Filles du Calvaire, novel, Julliard
- 1965: Variations sur l'imposture, short stories, Éditions Gallimard
- 1968: L'Autre personne, novel, Julliard (Prix Sainte-Beuve)
- 1970: Le Malheur fou, novel, Julliard
- 1972: Les Bons enfants, Tallandier
- 1974: Mardi à l’aube, Tallandier
- 1976: Un crime si juste, Éditions Grasset
- 1978: Les Destins ambigus, Grasset
