= Charles James Theriat =

American artist

Charles James Theriat (January 4, 1860 – April 17, 1937) was an American artist known for his work as an Orientalist.

== Early life and education ==
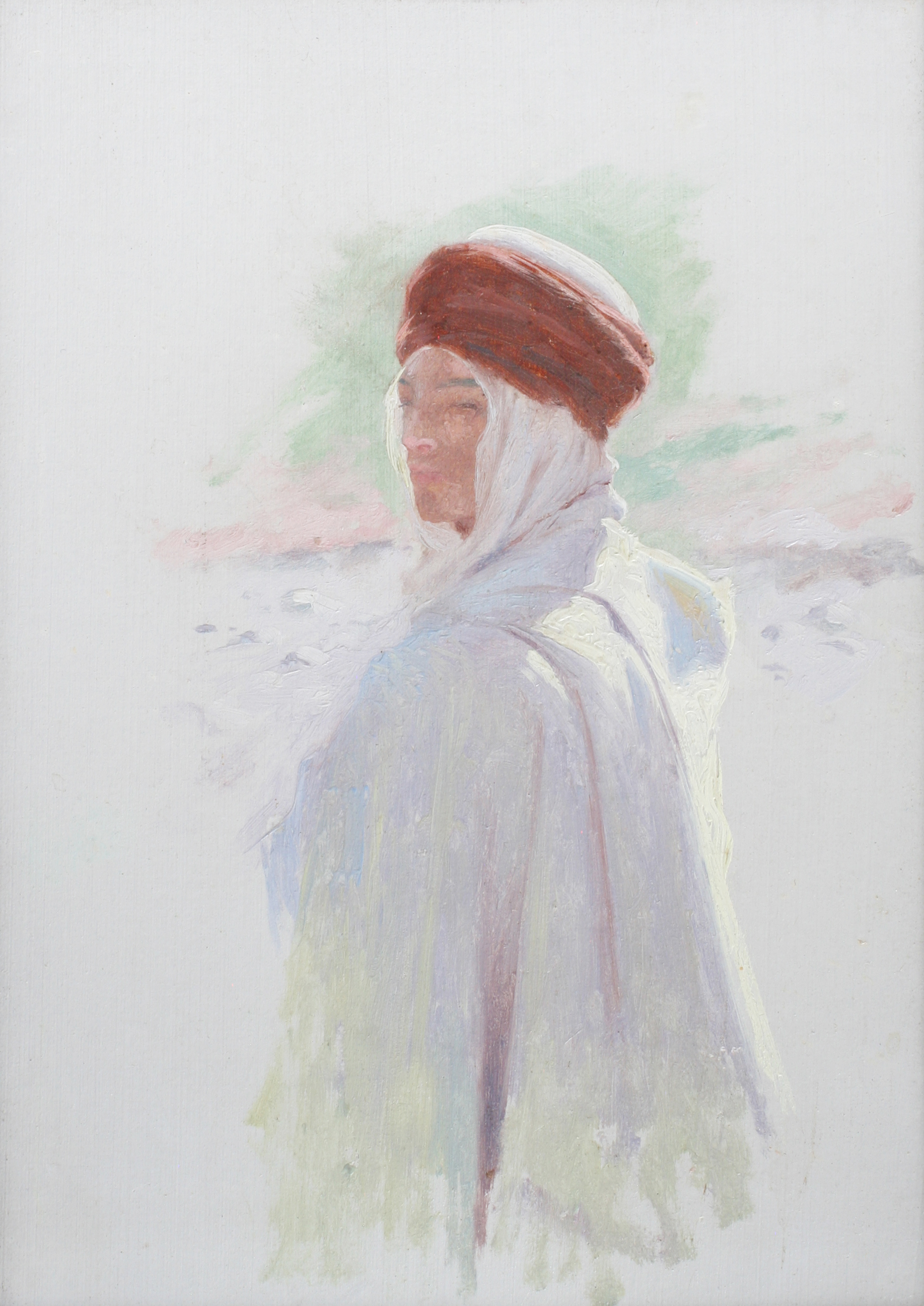
An Arab man gazes at a desert landscape. This portrait evokes the dazzling sunlight favored by Theriat.

At the age of twelve, Charles James Theriat moved with his family from the city of his birth, New York, to Europe. He began his artistic training at the Académie Julian in Paris in 1880, studying there with Jules-Joseph Lefebvre (1836 – 1911) and Gustave-Clarence-Rodolphe Boulanger (1824 – 1888) until 1885.

== Career ==
Theriat made his public debut as a painter with a portrait at the Paris Salon in 1886. His fascination was primarily with the desert reaches North Africa, especially Algeria, although he occasionally painted portraits, domestic genre interiors, and city views. He likely first wintered in Algeria in 1888, probably to escape the frigid Parisian winter where he had a studio on rue de Douai.

Most Orientalists were urban painters, preferring picturesque city streets and bazaars and exotic harem interiors. But Theriat’s work was mostly plein air, focusing on the nomadic life of the desert and the poverty of the ksours (oasis towns). He went as far into the Sahara as Touggourt, but preferred the artists' colony at Biskra. His artwork shows a particularly affinity to the wide open land and large expanses of sky, often presenting the desert with little, if any, human or animal life. He almost always worked out of doors instead of in a studio, except for an Arab house in Biskra and a tent when he ventured further south. His oasis town scenes demonstrated a fascination with the dazzle of decrepit whitewashed buildings in brilliant sunlight.

Theriat exhibited his Orientalist artworks at many of the most important turn-of-the-century exhibitions: 1893 in Chicago, 1895 in Berlin, 1896 in Dresden, 1900 in Paris, 1901 in Buffalo, and 1904 in St. Louis. His paintings won him medals at the Paris and Buffalo expositions.

== Later life ==
By 1896, Theriat had retired to Le Mèe, a quiet commune near Barbizon and the Forest of Fontainebleau. He continued to visit North Africa until the outbreak of World War I. During the war, Theriat remained in France, where he served as a captain for the American Red Cross. He died at Neuilly-sur-Seine in 1937.
