= Hôtel de Ville, Le Mée-sur-Seine =

Town hall in Le Mée-sur-Seine, France

Hôtel de Ville
- The main frontage of the Hôtel de Ville in February 2016

General information
- Type: City hall
- Architectural style: Modern style
- Location: Le Mée-sur-Seine, France
- Coordinates: 48.5384°N 2.6335°E
- Completed: 1959

The Hôtel de Ville (French pronunciation: [otɛl də vil], City Hall) is a municipal building in Le Mée-sur-Seine, Seine-et-Marne, in southeastern suburbs of Paris, standing on Route de Boissise.

== History ==
The combined town hall and school in the village centre

Following the French Revolution, the town council initially met at the home of the mayor at the time. This arrangement continued until the mid-19th century when the council established a combined town hall and school in the village centre. The design involved an asymmetrical main frontage of four bays facing onto the street. The second bay on the left featured a doorway with a moulded surround and a cornice on the ground floor and a square panel containing an oculus on the first floor. The other bays were fenestrated by casement windows with window shutters. Internally, the principal rooms were a classroom on the ground floor and a municipal office on the first floor. This building incorporated a small museum after the sculptor, Henri Chapu, presented a collection of his works to the council in 1886.

In 1934, the council led by the mayor, Henri Charny, established a new town hall on the corner of Rue de la Lyve and Rue du Lavoir. This building served as the town hall for some 75 years. After it was no longer required for municipal use, it was acquired by a developer, SRPI, who subsequently converted it, together with the adjacent recreation centre, for residential use as a series of private apartments.

In 2009, following significant population growth, the council led by the mayor, Franck Vernin, decided to acquire a more substantial municipal building. The building they selected was the former Nycomed Laboratories on Route de Boissise. The building had been commissioned as a pharmaceutical research establishment known as Valpan Laboratories in 1959. It was acquired by the German pharmaceutical company, BYK Gulden, in 1968, which, from 1984, was a subsidiary of another German pharmaceutical company, Altana. In September 2006, Altana sold its entire pharmaceuticals division to the Swiss pharmaceutical company, Nycomed, which then closed the facility in 2007. After conversion for municipal use, the building was officially re-opened on 11 September 2010.

The design involved a long main frontage of two storeys facing onto the street. The central section of two bays featured, on the ground floor, a coat of arms on the left and a doorway on the right and, on the first floor, a box-shaped structure which was projected forward and contained three horizontal windows on the left and a casement window on the right. The wings were fenestrated by square casement windows with dark frames. Internally, the principal room was the Salle du Conseil (council chamber).
