= Hôtel de Ville, Combs-la-Ville =

Town hall in Combs-la-Ville, France

Hôtel de Ville
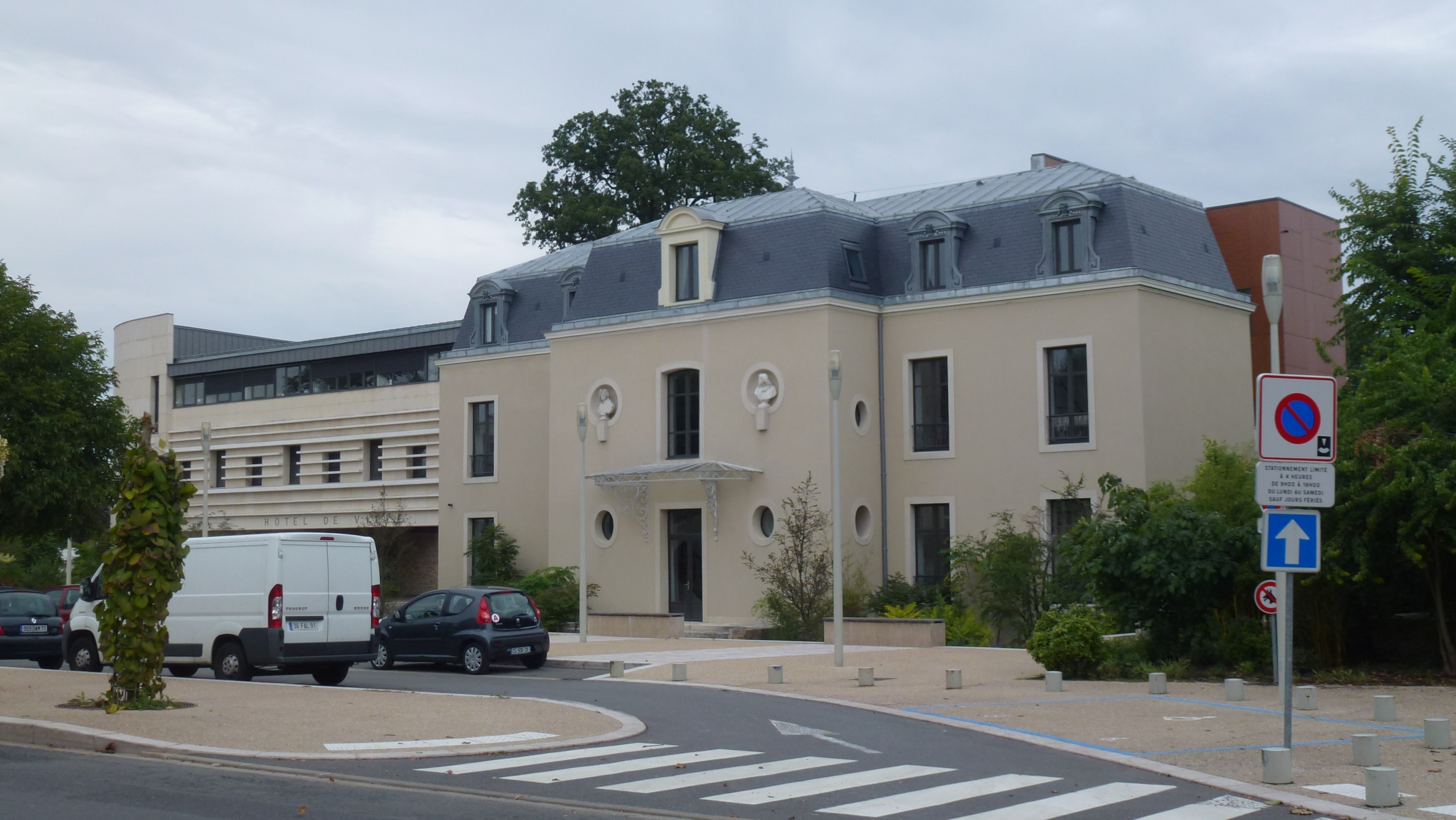
- The main frontage of the Hôtel de Ville in September 2013
- Interactive map of the Hôtel de Ville area

General information
- Type: City hall
- Architectural style: Neoclassical style
- Location: Combs-la-Ville, France
- Coordinates: 48.6649°N 2.5653°E
- Completed: 1809

The Hôtel de Ville (French pronunciation: [otɛl də vil], City Hall) is a municipal building in Combs-la-Ville, Seine-et-Marne in the southeastern suburbs of Paris, standing on Rue Sommeville.

== History ==
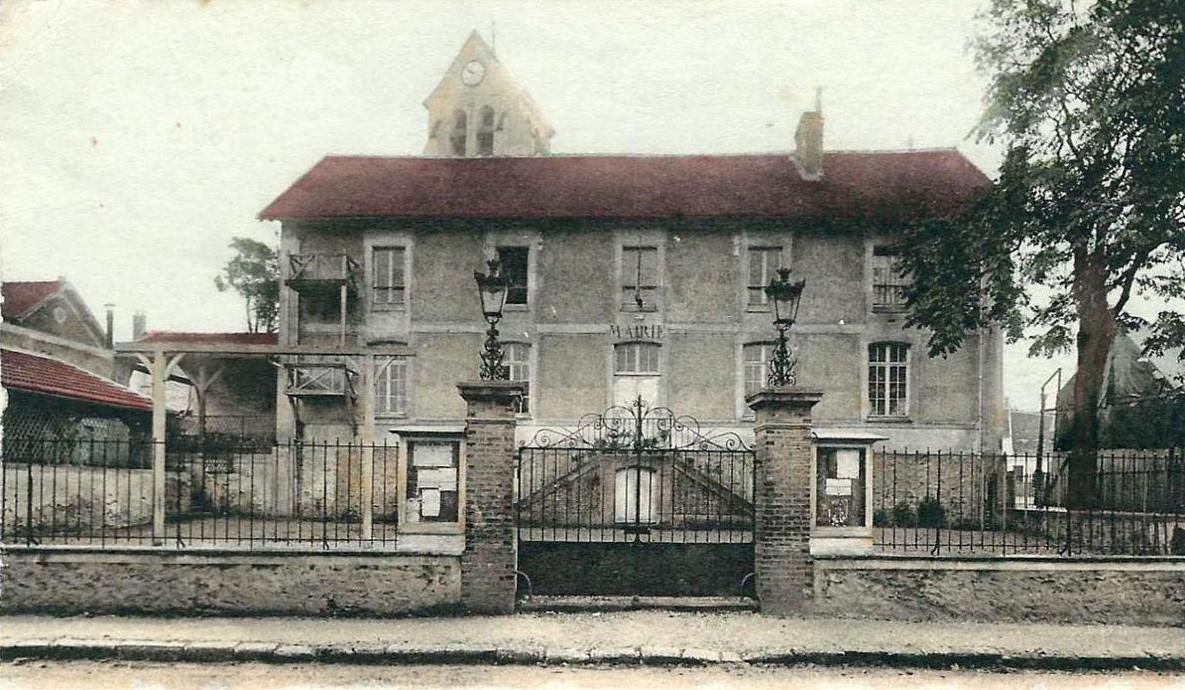
The first town hall

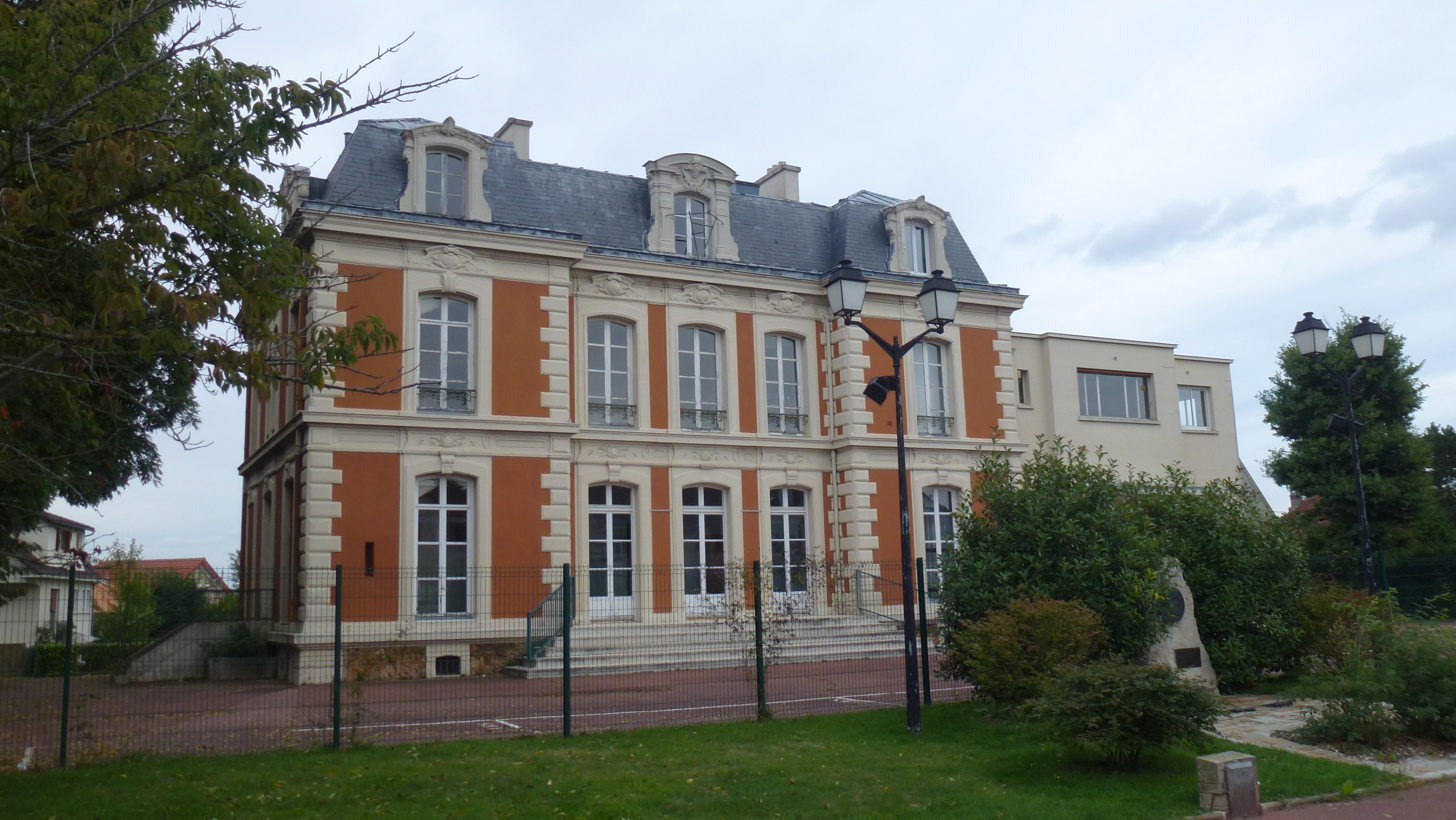
Château des Marronniers

=== The first town hall ===
Following the French Revolution, the town council initially met in the house of the mayor at the time. This arrangement continued until the mid-19th century, when the council decided to establish a town hall. The site they selected was just to the north of the Church of Saint-Vincent in the old part of the town. The building was designed in the neoclassical style and built in brick with a cement render finish. The design involved a symmetrical main frontage of five bays facing north onto Rue Sommeville. The central bay featured a double forestair leading up to a segmental-headed doorway of the first floor, with a casement window on the first floor. The other bays were fenestrated in a similar style. After the building was no longer required for municipal purposes, it served as a community centre and, since 1964, it has accommodated a community education centre known as L'Oreille Cassée (the Broken Ear) which organises concerts for young people.

=== Château des Marronniers ===
In 1930, following significant population growth, the council led by the mayor, Henri Lebœuf, decided to acquire a more substantial property. The building they selected was the Château des Marronniers on the north side of Rue de Verdun. The château had been commissioned by a railway engineer, Sieur Wahl. It had been designed in the neoclassical style, built in red brick with stone finishings and was completed in the 19th century. The design involved a symmetrical main frontage of five bays facing onto the street, with the end bays slightly projected forward. The central section of three bays contained three French doors with keystones on the ground floor and three tall casement windows surmounted by cartouches on the first floor. The end bays were fenestrated in a similar style. There was a finely carved frieze above the first-floor windows and a cornice and a series of dormer windows at roof level. After the building had been converted for municipal purposes, the council relocated there in 1932.

After the château was no longer required for municipal purposes, it was kept in public ownership. Between 2015 and 2019, while other buildings were being refurbished, it accommodated a local community centre, and between 2024 and 2025, it was used as a local media library.

=== The current town hall ===
In the early 21st century, following further population growth, the council led by the mayor, Guy Geoffroy, again decided to acquire a more substantial building. The building they selected was the Villa Notre-Dame, which was on the south side of Rue Sommeville, some 300 metres (980 ft) west of the first town hall. The estate had belonged to the seigneury of Menchy in the 16th century. It then became the property of Louis Stanislas in 1775. After the French Revolution, it was acquired by Cécile Philippine Savoet, wife of Alexandre de Ceas. She ordered the demolition of the old manor house and commissioned the current building. It was designed in the neoclassical style, built in ashlar stone and was completed in 1809. The design involved a symmetrical main frontage of seven bays facing onto the street. The central section of three bays, which was projected forward, featured a doorway flanked a pair of oculi on the ground floor, a segmental headed window flanked by a pair of busts on the first floor, and a dormer window at roof level. The outer bays were fenestrated in a similar style. The busts depicted the playwrights, Jean Racine and Molière.

In September 1817, the house was acquired by Baron August Wilhelm von Pappenheim, who Louis I, Grand Duke of Hesse had been sent as minister plenipotentiary to the court of Louis XVIII. Pappenheim was a keen gardener and established a collection of over 4,000 hardy plants in the garden. The house was then donated to a religious organisation, the Lutèce Mutual Society, in 1827. It was subsequently used as a retirement home for priests and continued in that use until 1982. After the Villa Notre-Dame had been acquired by the council, a long two-storey extension was built to the west of the original building. The enlarged complex was officially reopened by the Prime Minister of France, Dominique de Villepin, on 29 May 2006.
