= Savigny-le-Temple =

- Commune
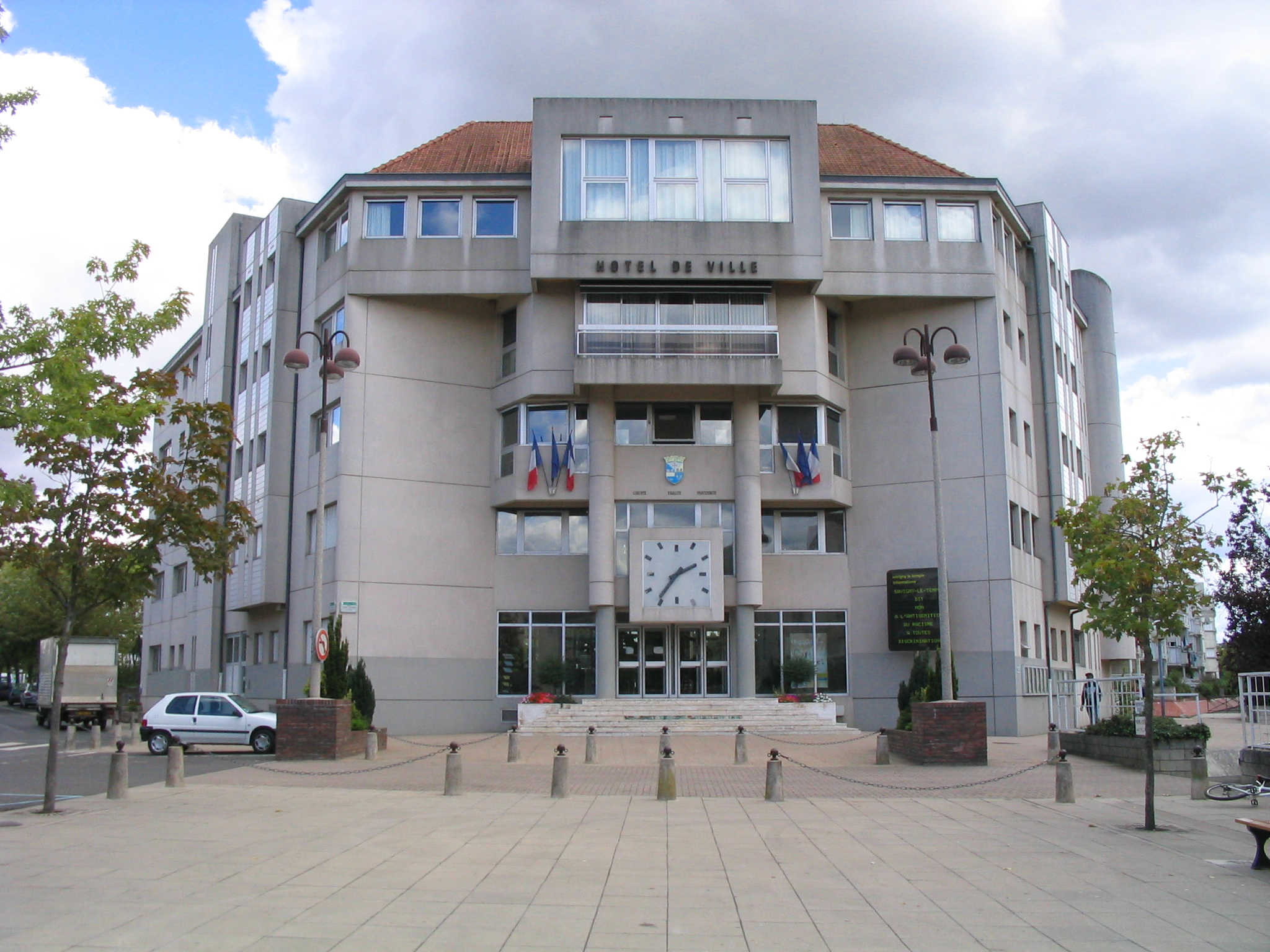
- The Hôtel de Ville

- Coat of arms

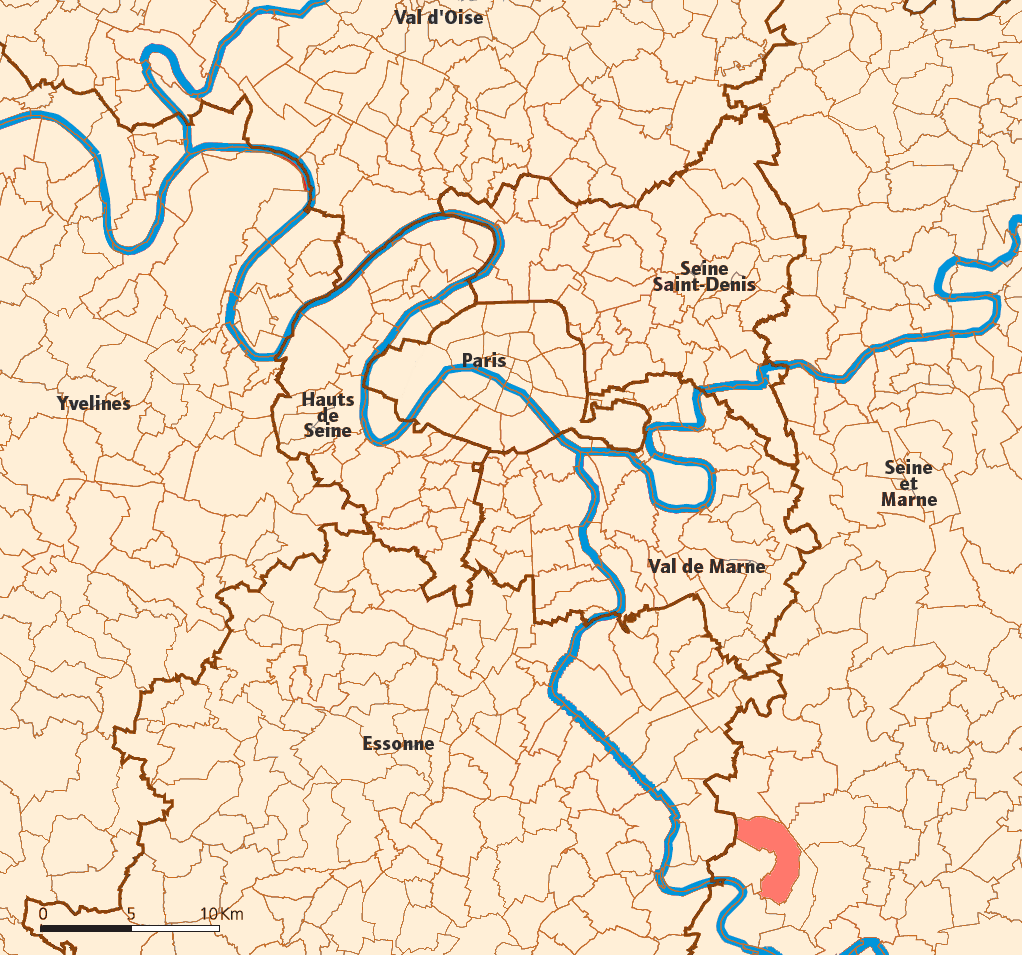
- Location (in red) within Paris inner and outer suburbs
- Location of Savigny-le-Temple
- Location within France Location within Île-de-France (region)
- Coordinates: 48°35′03″N 2°35′00″E
- Country: France
- Region: Île-de-France
- Department: Seine-et-Marne
- Arrondissement: Melun
- Canton: Savigny-le-Temple
- Intercommunality: CA Grand Paris Sud Seine-Essonne-Sénart

Government
  - Mayor (2020–2026): Marie-Line Pichery
- Area^{1}: 11.97 km^{2} (4.62 sq mi)
- Elevation: 77 m (253 ft)
- Highest elevation: 91 m (299 ft)
- Lowest elevation: 58 m (190 ft)
- Population (2023): 31,148
  - Density: 2,602/km^{2} (6,740/sq mi)
- Demonym: Savigniens
- Time zone: UTC+01:00 (CET)
  - Summer (DST): UTC+02:00 (CEST)
- INSEE/Postal code: 77445 /77176
- ^{1} French Land Register data, which excludes lakes, ponds, glaciers > 1 km^{2} (0.386 sq mi or 247 acres) and river estuaries.

Savigny-le-Temple (French: [saviɲi l(ə) tɑ̃pl]; lit. 'Savigny-the-Temple') is a commune in the Seine-et-Marne department in Île-de-France in north-central France. It is located on the departmental border with Essonne, 33.2 km (20.6 mi) from the centre of Paris. It is the most populated commune in the "new town" of Sénart, created in the 1970s, in the southeastern outer suburbs of Paris.

== History ==
During the French Revolution, Savigny-le-Temple (meaning "Savigny the temple") was temporarily renamed Savigny-sur-Balory (meaning "Savigny upon Balory", after the small Balory river). It was also temporarily renamed Savigny-le-Port (meaning "Savigny the port"). These changes were probably motivated by the religious connotation of the word "temple". The Hôtel de Ville was completed in 1985.

== Demographics ==
Inhabitants of Savigny-le-Temple are called Savigniens (masculine) and Savigniennes (feminine) in French.

Historical population

Year	Pop.	±% p.a.
1793	390	—
1800	543	+4.84%
1806	534	−0.28%
1821	550	+0.20%
1831	562	+0.22%
1836	564	+0.07%
1841	579	+0.53%
1846	664	+2.78%
1851	631	−1.01%
1856	625	−0.19%
1861	638	+0.41%
1866	667	+0.89%
1872	640	−0.69%
1876	615	−0.99%
1881	596	−0.63%
1886	586	−0.34%
1891	590	+0.14%
1896	576	−0.48%
1901	590	+0.48%

Year	Pop.	±% p.a.
1906	542	−1.68%
1911	521	−0.79%
1921	570	+0.90%
1926	596	+0.90%
1931	727	+4.05%
1936	685	−1.18%
1946	706	+0.30%
1954	770	+1.09%
1962	759	−0.18%
1968	828	+1.46%
1975	2,881	+19.50%
1982	11,835	+22.37%
1990	18,520	+5.76%
1999	22,339	+2.10%
2007	26,905	+2.35%
2012	29,555	+1.90%
2017	29,984	+0.29%
2023	31,148	+0.64%

Source: EHESS and INSEE (1968–2023)

== Personalities ==
- Claude Makélélé, football player (Real Madrid, Chelsea, Paris Saint-Germain), grew up in Savigny-le-Temple.
- Olivier Bernard, football player (Newcastle United, Southampton, Rangers), grew up in Savigny-le-Temple.
- Clément Chantôme, football player (Paris Saint-Germain), grew up in Savigny-le-Temple.

== Transport ==
Savigny-le-Temple is served by Savigny-le-Temple – Nandy station on Paris RER line.

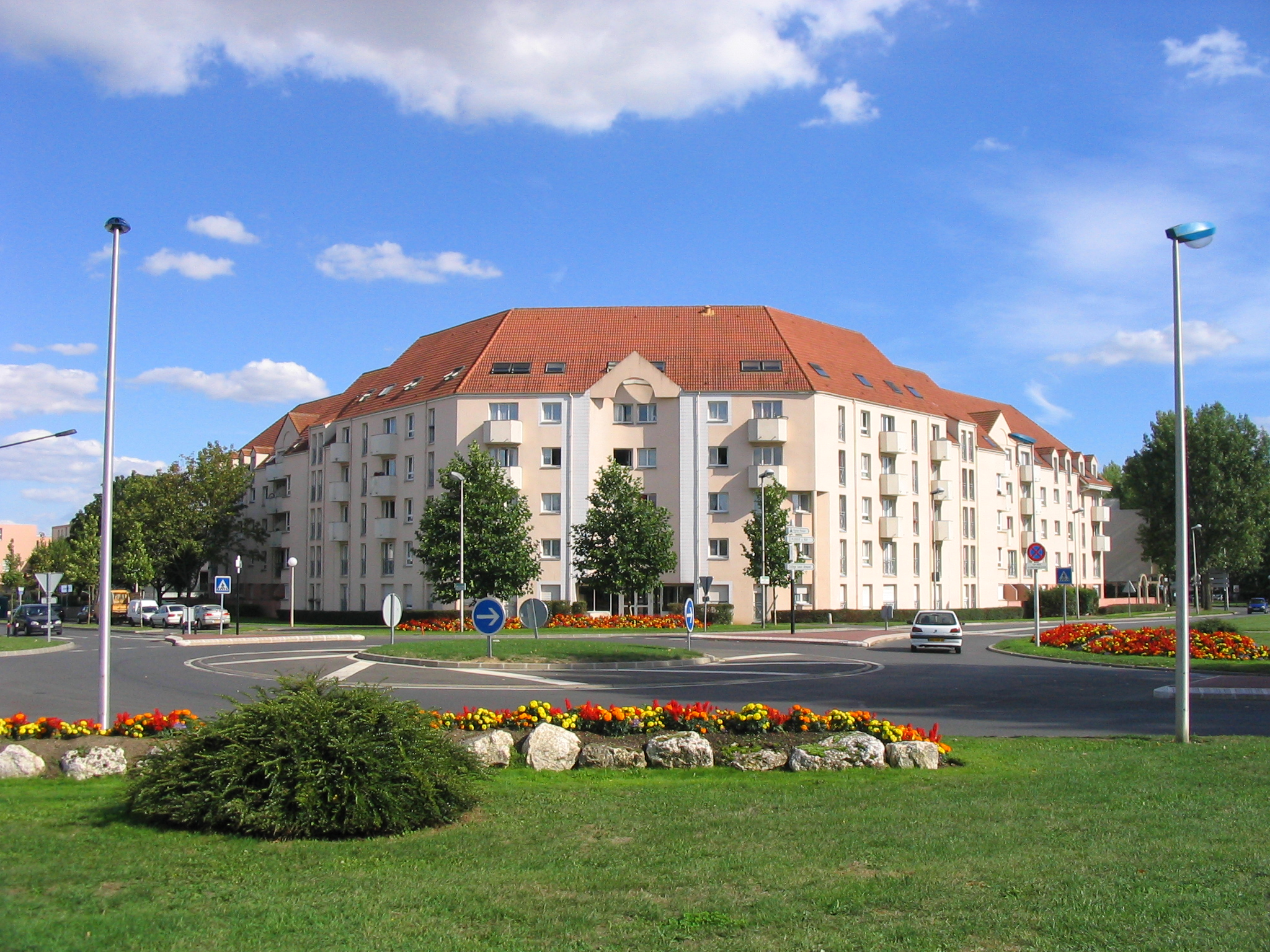
Building

== See also ==
- Communes of the Seine-et-Marne department
