= Gaston Carraud =

French composer and music critic

Gaston Carraud (20 July 1864 – 15 June 1920) was a French composer and music critic.

== Life ==
Born at Le Mée-sur-Seine, Carraud was the son of Ivan Carraud (1826–1881), general inspector of water and forests, general adviser of the Cher, and of Zoé de Ridder (1835–1903), of Belgian origin, and the grandson of Zulma Carraud, née Tourangin, writer and friend of Honoré de Balzac.

Carraud began his musical training at the "École Monge", receiving instruction from Albéric Magnard, Charles Koechlin, Jacques Pillois, André Caplet and Gabriel Bender. He then studied musical composition at the Conservatoire de Paris with Jules Massenet and obtained in 1890 the Premier Grand Prix de Rome with the cantata Cléopâtre after a text by Fernand Beissier.

He later composed the symphonic poems La Chevauchée de la chimère, Les Nuits after the poems by Alfred de Musset and the overture Buona Pasqua. From 1905, he worked as a music critic for the newspaper La Liberté. In 1921, his book La Vie, l'œuvre et la mort d'Albéric Magnard (1865-1914) was published in Paris.

Carraud died in his home in the 8th arrondissement of Paris.

He rests in the family plot at Nohant-en-Graçay cemetery (Cher), next to Zulma Carraud.
