= Ploshchad Tukaya =

Kazan Metro Station

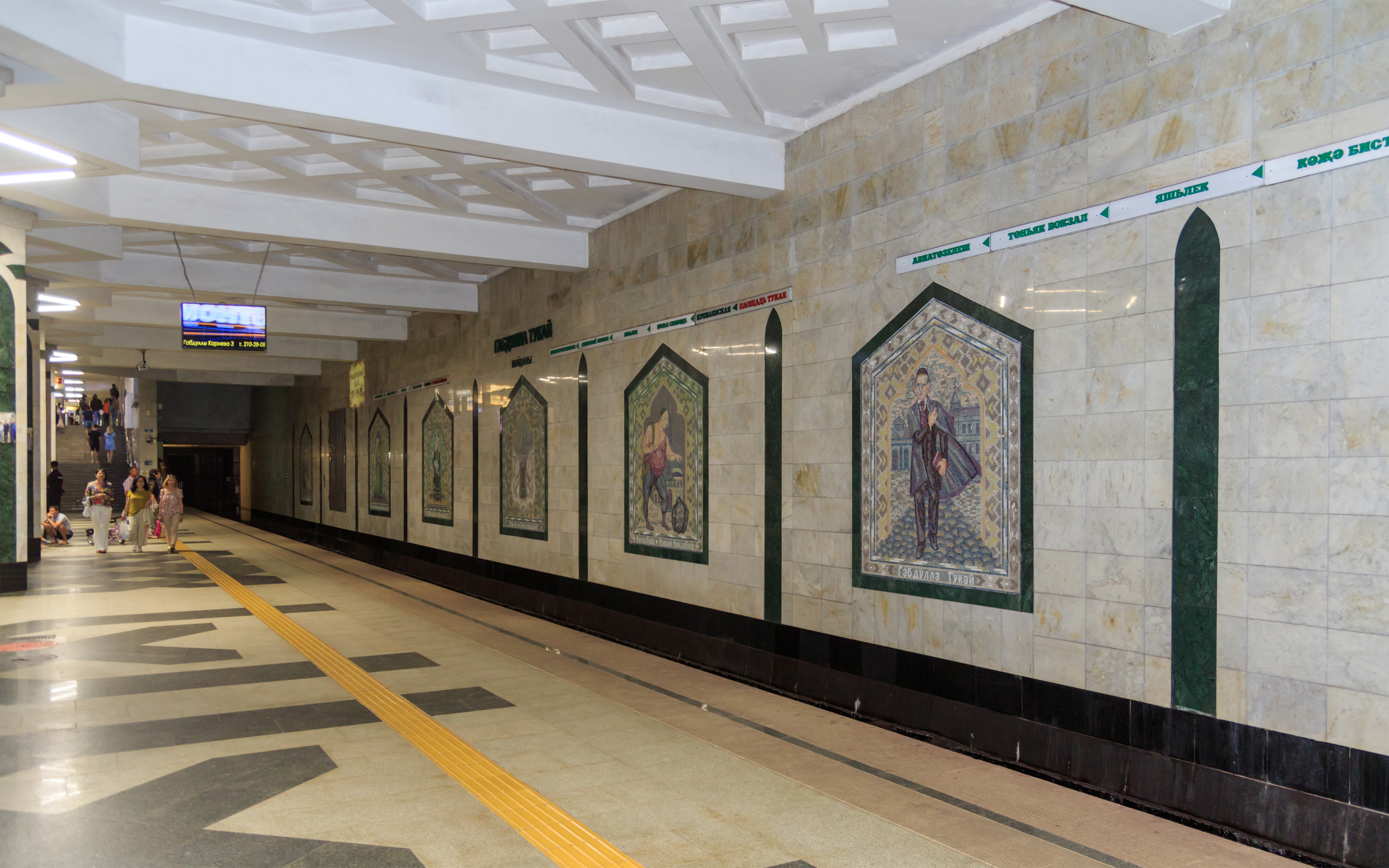

General information
- Coordinates: 55°47′12″N 49°07′22″E
- Owner: Kazan Metro
- Platforms: 1 Island platform
- Tracks: 2

History
- Opened: 27 August 2005

Services
Preceding station	Kazan Metro	Following station
Kremlyovskaya towards Aviastroitelnaya	First Line	Sukonnaya Sloboda towards Dubravnaya
Location

Ploshchad Tukaya (Russian: Площадь Тукая) is a station of the Kazan Metro. Opened as part of the first stage of the system on 27 August 2005, it is located in very center of the city, and is named after the square which carries the name of the famous Tatar poet Ğabdulla Tuqay.

The station is a standard sub-surface pillar bi-span arrangement, with 12 square concrete pillars running along the central axis of the platform. Architects M. Bykov, V. Kudryashov and R. Safin took a theme that was reminiscent of the romantic Tatar literature period during the poet's years.

The walls of the station are faced with identical white marble, but between the green pilasters contain a set of 22 mosaics from Italian smalt. One side is dedicated to Tukay himself, containing a portrait of the poet, main heroes of his poems and ordinary village life as described by him. The second side shows images of the history and life of the Tatars and Kazan as described by Tukay.

The floor of the station repeats the green - white tones (made from polished Gabbro, Starobabansky and Mansurovsky granite tiles), also follows the same ornament picture that is seen on the pillars.

The station contains two vestibules. Both of which repeat the image of the station with identical pillars and marble walls featuring metallic ornaments. The southern one is surface level, and occupies the ground floor of the Noviy Detsky Mir store, with access to the Peterburgskaya Street. The northern one was delayed in opening until May 2006, and is located under the intersection of the Pushkina and the Peterburgskaya Street which form the Tukaya Square. A sculpture of Tukay, and his main hero Shurale was opened on New Year 2007 in the northern vestibule, and access to the underground floor of the Koltso shopping centre was added in November 2006.
