= Brie-Comte-Robert =

- Commune
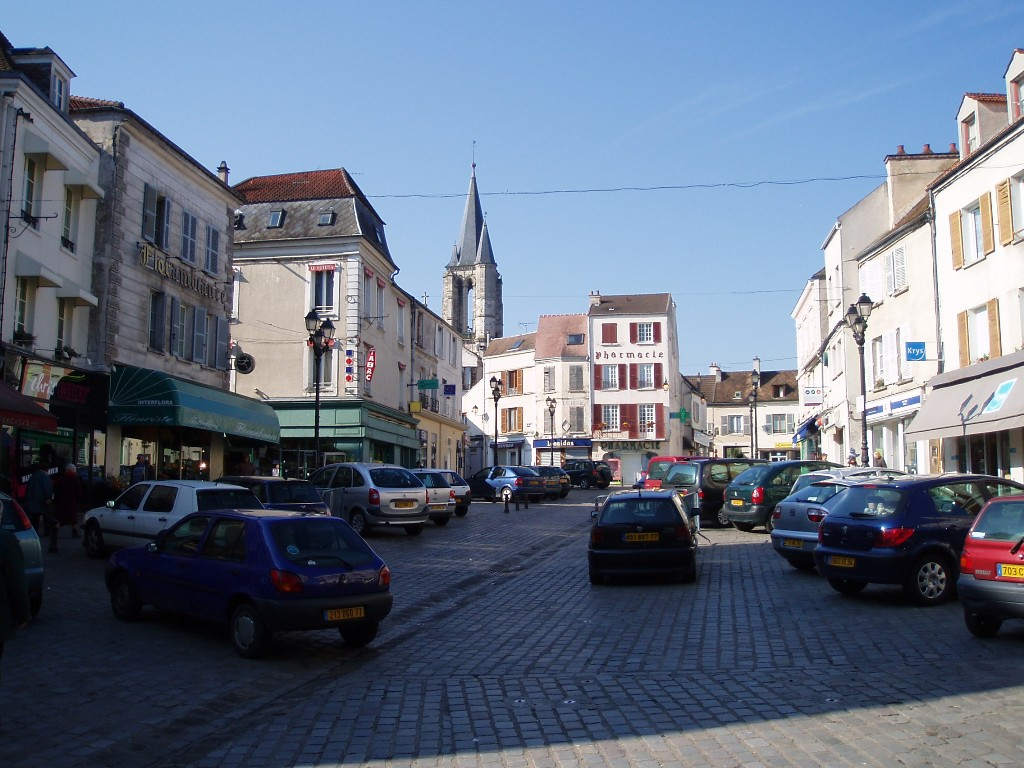
- The market square in Brie-Comte-Robert

- Coat of arms

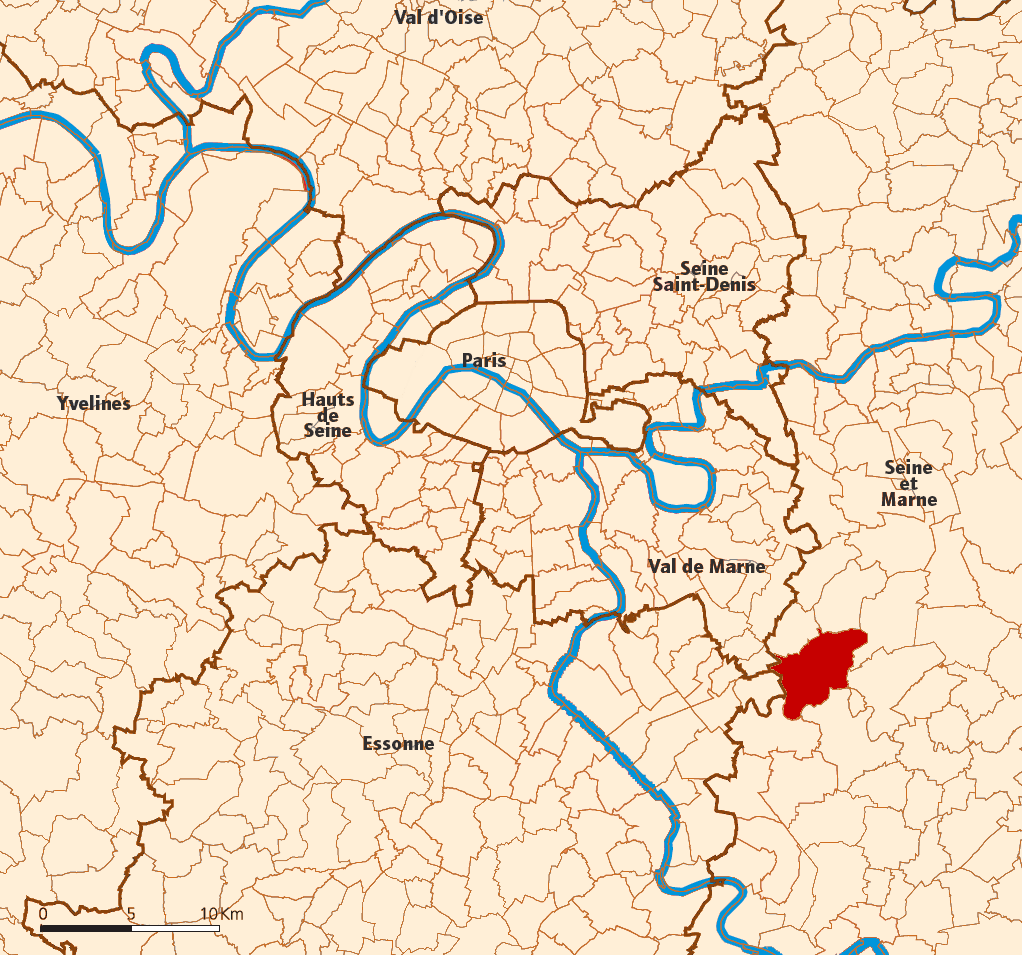
- Location (in red) within Paris inner and outer suburbs
- Location of Brie-Comte-Robert
- Location within France Location within Île-de-France (region)
- Coordinates: 48°41′30″N 2°36′30″E
- Country: France
- Region: Île-de-France
- Department: Seine-et-Marne
- Arrondissement: Torcy
- Canton: Combs-la-Ville
- Intercommunality: CC L'Orée de la Brie

Government
  - Mayor (2020–2026): Jean Laviolette
- Area^{1}: 19.93 km^{2} (7.70 sq mi)
- Highest elevation: 104 m (341 ft)
- Lowest elevation: 47 m (154 ft)
- Population (2023): 19,003
  - Density: 953.5/km^{2} (2,470/sq mi)
- Time zone: UTC+01:00 (CET)
  - Summer (DST): UTC+02:00 (CEST)
- INSEE/Postal code: 77053 /77170
- ^{1} French Land Register data, which excludes lakes, ponds, glaciers > 1 km^{2} (0.386 sq mi or 247 acres) and river estuaries.

Brie-Comte-Robert (French pronunciation: [bʁi kɔ̃t ʁɔbɛʁ]) is a commune in the Seine-et-Marne department in the Île-de-France region in north-central France.

Brie-Comte-Robert is on the edge of the plain of Brie and was formerly the capital of the Brie française.

"Brie" comes from the Gaulish briga, meaning "plateau". The "Comte Robert" was Robert I of Dreux who owned the town and was a brother of the King Louis VII.

== Population ==
The inhabitants are called Briards in French.

Historical population

Year	Pop.	±% p.a.
1793	2,600	—
1800	2,571	−0.16%
1806	2,487	−0.55%
1821	2,687	+0.52%
1831	2,762	+0.28%
1836	2,725	−0.27%
1841	2,665	−0.44%
1846	2,746	+0.60%
1851	2,716	−0.22%
1856	2,615	−0.76%
1861	2,881	+1.96%
1866	2,792	−0.63%
1872	2,714	−0.47%
1876	2,770	+0.51%
1881	2,629	−1.04%
1886	2,600	−0.22%
1891	2,772	+1.29%
1896	2,688	−0.61%
1901	2,718	+0.22%

Year	Pop.	±% p.a.
1906	2,685	−0.24%
1911	2,651	−0.25%
1921	2,522	−0.50%
1926	2,784	+2.00%
1931	3,179	+2.69%
1936	3,164	−0.09%
1946	3,226	+0.19%
1954	3,511	+1.06%
1962	4,689	+3.68%
1968	6,100	+4.48%
1975	8,706	+5.21%
1982	10,347	+2.50%
1990	11,501	+1.33%
1999	13,397	+1.71%
2007	15,630	+1.95%
2012	16,415	+0.98%
2017	17,817	+1.65%
2023	19,003	+1.08%

Source: EHESS and INSEE (1968-2023)

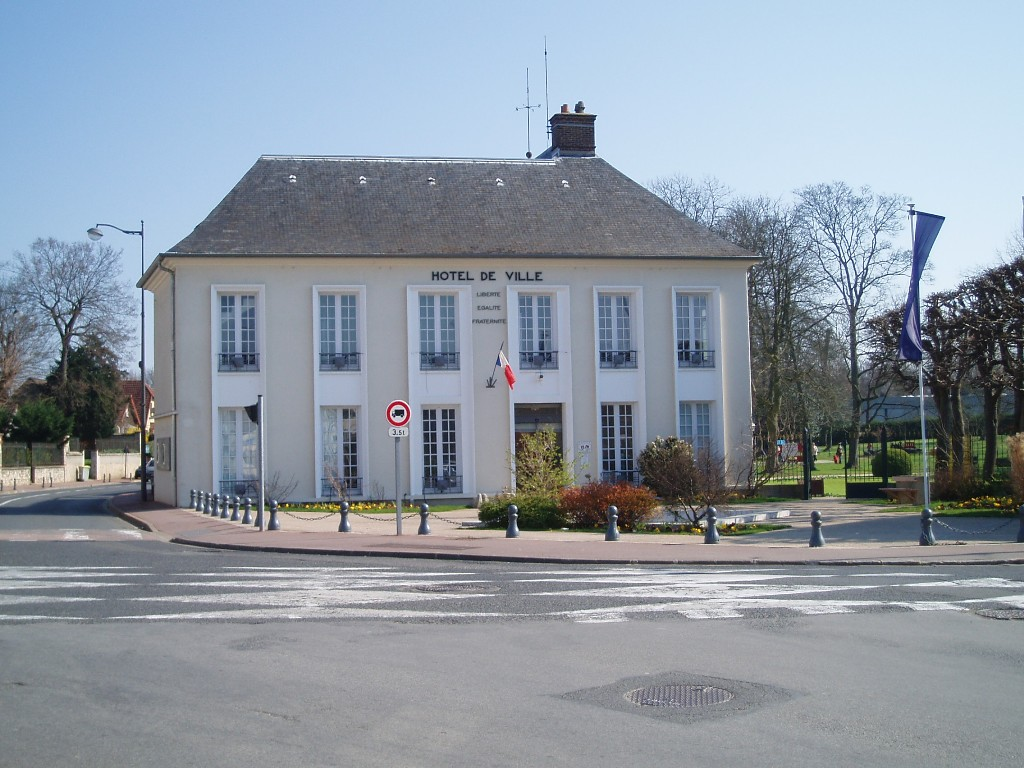
Town Hall

== Sights ==
- The medieval castle
- Église Saint-Étienne: (13th century) Gothic church, with its original rose window above the quire, wood panels of the 15th century.
- Hôtel-Dieu: (13th century) this place has been a hospital, then a nunnery. A recent building has been built, using the original facade of the chapel.

== See also ==
- Villemeneux
- Communes of the Seine-et-Marne department
