= Moissy-Cramayel =

- Commune
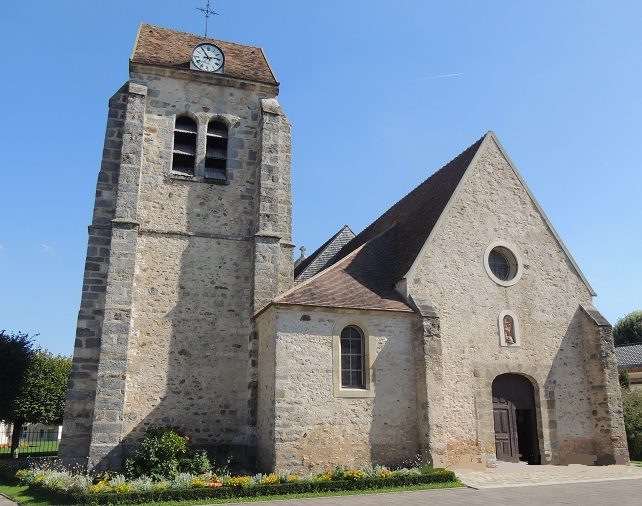
- The church in Moissy

- Coat of arms

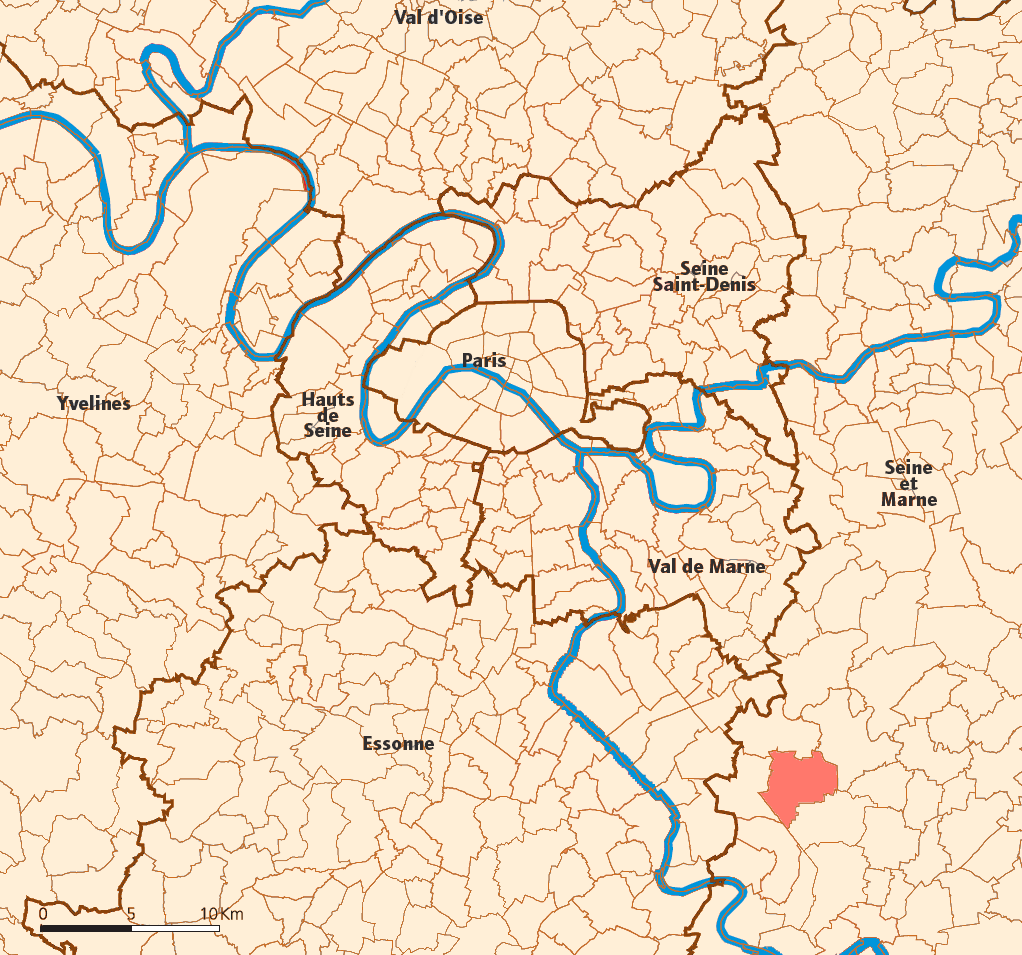
- Location (in red) within Paris inner and outer suburbs
- Location of Moissy-Cramayel
- Location within France Location within Île-de-France (region)
- Coordinates: 48°37′37″N 2°35′35″E
- Country: France
- Region: Île-de-France
- Department: Seine-et-Marne
- Arrondissement: Melun
- Canton: Combs-la-Ville
- Intercommunality: CA Grand Paris Sud Seine-Essonne-Sénart

Government
  - Mayor (2020–2026): Line Magne
- Area^{1}: 14.28 km^{2} (5.51 sq mi)
- Highest elevation: 94 m (308 ft)
- Lowest elevation: 83 m (272 ft)
- Population (2023): 18,511
  - Density: 1,296/km^{2} (3,357/sq mi)
- Time zone: UTC+01:00 (CET)
  - Summer (DST): UTC+02:00 (CEST)
- INSEE/Postal code: 77296 /77550
- ^{1} French Land Register data, which excludes lakes, ponds, glaciers > 1 km^{2} (0.386 sq mi or 247 acres) and river estuaries.

Moissy-Cramayel (French pronunciation: [mwasi kʁamajɛl]) is a commune in the Seine-et-Marne department in the Île-de-France region in north-central France. It is part of the urban unit (agglomeration) of Paris, 33 km (21 mi) southeast of the center of Paris, in the "new town" of Sénart, created in the 1970s.

Its inhabitants are called Moisséens.

== History ==
During the French Revolution, Moissy-Cramayel was temporarily renamed Moissy-la-Plaine, meaning "Moissy the Plain".

== Population ==
Historical population
Year	Pop.	±% p.a.
1968	2,364	—
1975	3,172	+4.29%
1982	5,195	+7.30%
1990	12,263	+11.33%
1999	14,298	+1.72%
2007	16,932	+2.14%
2012	17,452	+0.61%
2017	17,713	+0.30%
2023	18,511	+0.74%
Source: INSEE

== Transportation ==
Moissy-Cramayel is served by Lieusaint – Moissy station on Paris RER line.

== Town twinning ==
Moissy-Cramayel is twinned with:

- Rosenfeld, Germany - since 1971
- Rosso, Mauritania - since 1986
- Bușteni, Romania - since 1993

== See also ==
- Communes of the Seine-et-Marne department
- Moissy Cramayel US, a football club based in Moissy-Cramayel
