= Boissettes =

- Commune
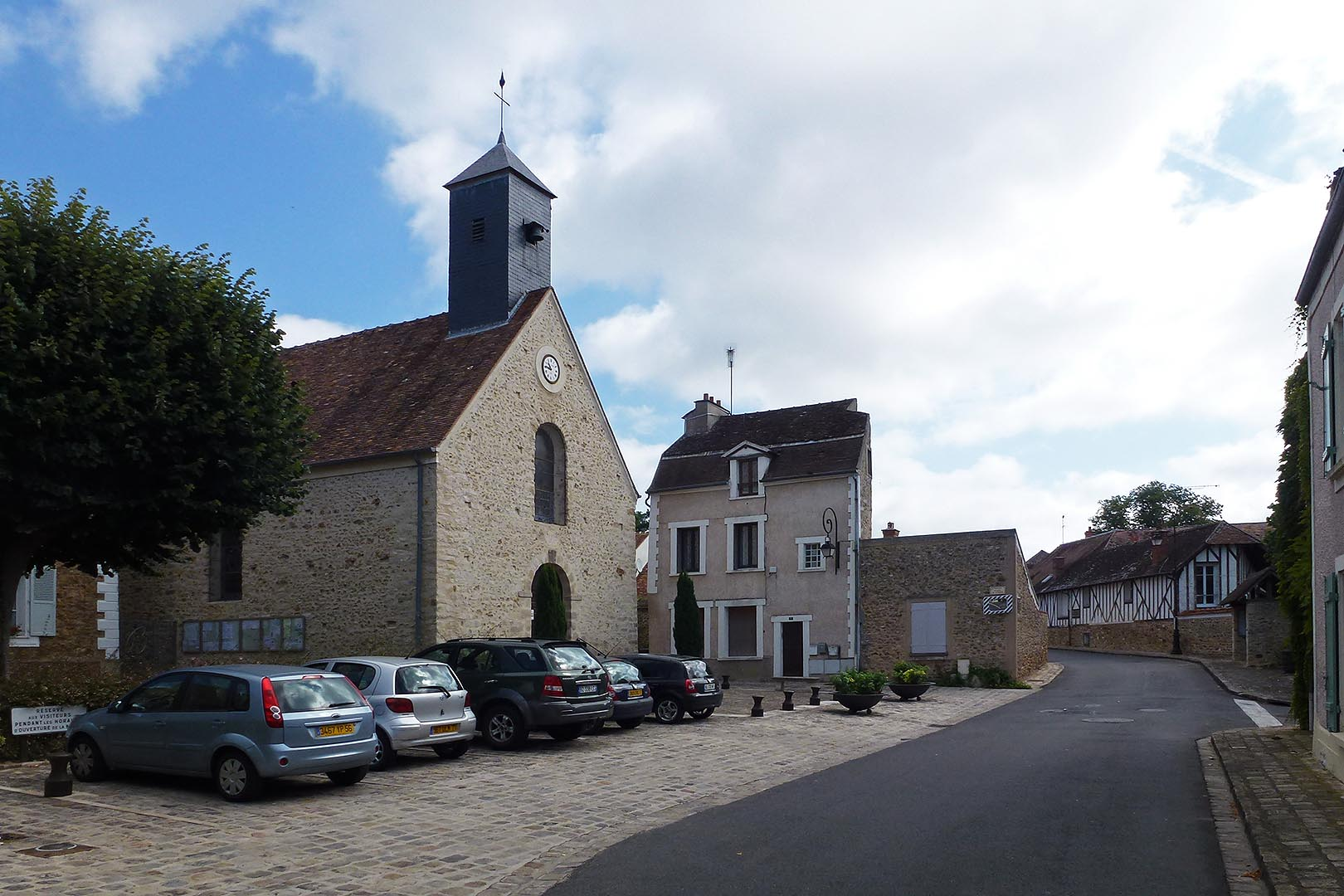
- The church in Boissettes
- Location of Boissettes
- Location within France Location within Île-de-France (region)
- Coordinates: 48°31′17″N 2°36′38″E
- Country: France
- Region: Île-de-France
- Department: Seine-et-Marne
- Arrondissement: Melun
- Canton: Savigny-le-Temple
- Intercommunality: CA Melun Val de Seine

Government
  - Mayor (2020–2026): Thierry Segura
- Area^{1}: 1.54 km^{2} (0.59 sq mi)
- Highest elevation: 78 m (256 ft)
- Lowest elevation: 37 m (121 ft)
- Population (2023): 437
  - Density: 284/km^{2} (735/sq mi)
- Time zone: UTC+01:00 (CET)
  - Summer (DST): UTC+02:00 (CEST)
- INSEE/Postal code: 77038 /77350
- ^{1} French Land Register data, which excludes lakes, ponds, glaciers > 1 km^{2} (0.386 sq mi or 247 acres) and river estuaries.

Boissettes (French pronunciation: [bwasɛt]) is a commune in the Seine-et-Marne department in the Île-de-France region in north-central France.

== Demographics ==
The inhabitants are called Boissettais.

== See also ==
- Communes of the Seine-et-Marne department
