= Canton of Savigny-le-Temple =

Coordinates: 48°34′27″N 2°33′58″E

Savigny-le-Temple
- Canton
- Country: France
- Region: Île-de-France
- Department: Seine-et-Marne
- No. of communes: {{{nbcomm}}}
- Area: 49.76 km^{2} (19.21 sq mi)
- Population (2023): 72,831
  - Density: 1,464/km^{2} (3,791/sq mi)
- INSEE code: 77 20

The canton of Savigny-le-Temple is a French administrative division that is in the arrondissement of Melun, in the Seine-et-Marne département (Île-de-France région).

== Demographics ==
Historical population
Year	Pop.	±% p.a.
2013	69,104	—
2018	70,915	+0.52%
Source: INSEE

== Composition ==
At the French canton reorganisation which came into effect in March 2015, the canton was expanded from 3 to 6 communes:

- Boissettes
- Boissise-la-Bertrand
- Cesson
- Le Mée-sur-Seine
- Savigny-le-Temple
- Vert-Saint-Denis

== See also ==
- Cantons of the Seine-et-Marne department
- Communes of the Seine-et-Marne department
