= Combs-la-Ville =

- Commune
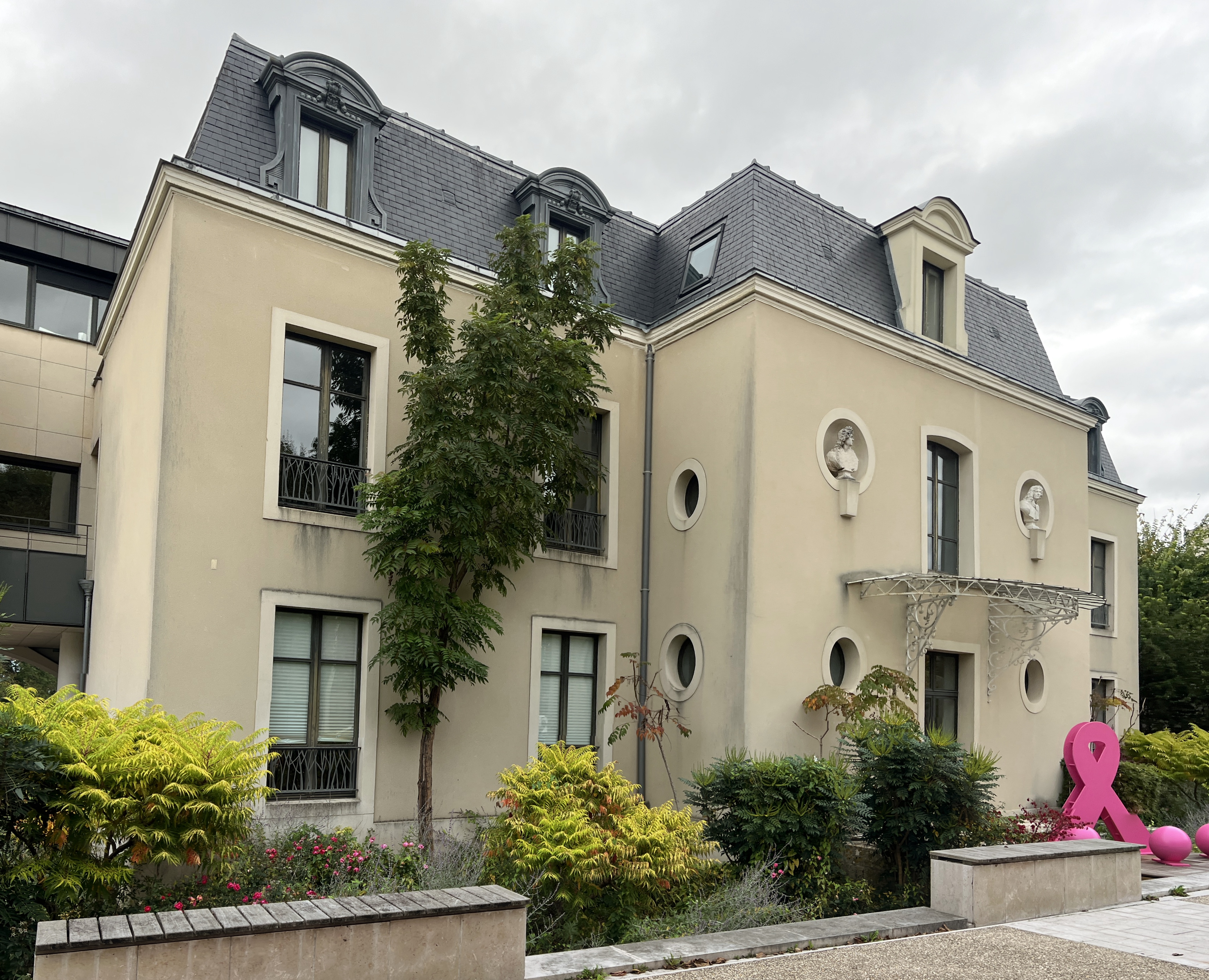
- The Hôtel de Ville

- Coat of arms

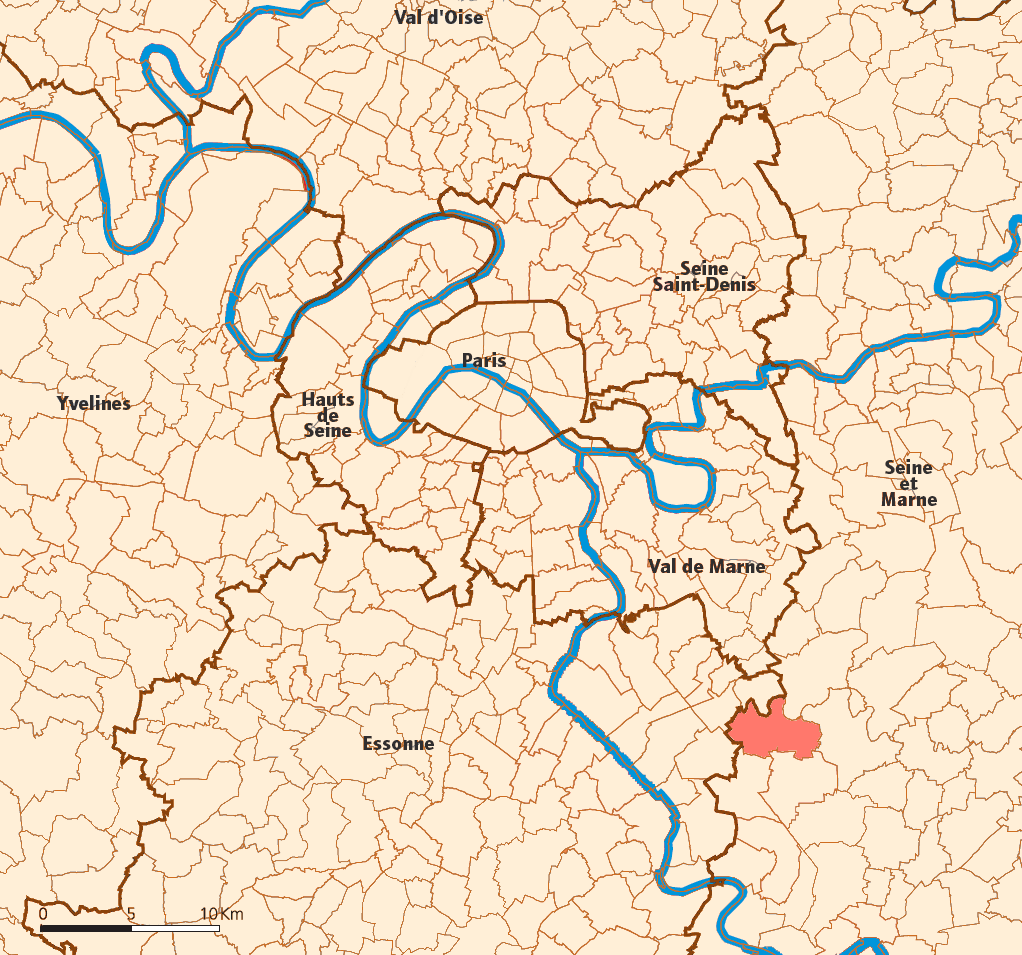
- Location (in red) within Paris inner and outer suburbs
- Location of Combs-la-Ville
- Location within France Location within Île-de-France (region)
- Coordinates: 48°40′N 2°34′E
- Country: France
- Region: Île-de-France
- Department: Seine-et-Marne
- Arrondissement: Melun
- Canton: Combs-la-Ville
- Intercommunality: CA Grand Paris Sud Seine-Essonne-Sénart

Government
  - Mayor (2020–2026): Guy Geoffroy
- Area^{1}: 14.48 km^{2} (5.59 sq mi)
- Highest elevation: 91 m (299 ft)
- Lowest elevation: 43 m (141 ft)
- Population (2023): 23,350
  - Density: 1,613/km^{2} (4,177/sq mi)
- Demonym: Combs-la-Villais
- Time zone: UTC+01:00 (CET)
  - Summer (DST): UTC+02:00 (CEST)
- INSEE/Postal code: 77122 /77380
- ^{1} French Land Register data, which excludes lakes, ponds, glaciers > 1 km^{2} (0.386 sq mi or 247 acres) and river estuaries.

Combs-la-Ville (French pronunciation: [kɔ̃b la vil]; lit. 'Combs-the-City') is a commune in the southeastern outer suburbs of Paris, in the Seine-et-Marne department in the Île-de-France in north-central France. It is on the departmental border with Essonne, 25.5 km (15.8 mi) from the centre of Paris, in the "new town" of Sénart, created in the 1970s.

== History ==
The original part of the current Hôtel de Ville was completed in 1809.

== Demographics ==
The inhabitants are called Combs-la-Villais in French.

Historical population

Year	Pop.	±% p.a.
1793	500	—
1800	540	+1.11%
1806	512	−0.88%
1821	507	−0.07%
1831	500	−0.14%
1836	493	−0.28%
1841	494	+0.04%
1846	540	+1.80%
1851	609	+2.43%
1856	610	+0.03%
1861	789	+5.28%
1866	749	−1.04%
1872	705	−1.00%
1876	676	−1.04%
1881	807	+3.61%
1886	881	+1.77%
1891	909	+0.63%
1896	1,067	+3.26%
1901	1,138	+1.30%

Year	Pop.	±% p.a.
1906	1,156	+0.31%
1911	1,394	+3.82%
1921	1,538	+0.99%
1926	1,797	+3.16%
1931	2,039	+2.56%
1936	2,386	+3.19%
1946	2,482	+0.40%
1954	2,833	+1.67%
1962	4,692	+6.51%
1968	6,192	+4.73%
1975	11,093	+8.69%
1982	13,759	+3.12%
1990	19,973	+4.77%
1999	20,953	+0.53%
2007	21,450	+0.29%
2012	22,031	+0.54%
2017	22,383	+0.32%
2023	23,350	+0.71%

Source: EHESS and INSEE (1968-2023)

== Transportation ==
Combs-la-Ville is served by Combs-la-Ville–Quincy station on Paris RER D.

== Twin towns ==
Combs-la-Ville is twinned with the towns of :

- Duderstadt in Germany since 1968
- Dali in Cyprus since 1978
- Oswestry in the United Kingdom since 1980
- R' Kiz in Mauritania since 1986
- Petite-Île in Réunion (an overseas department of France in the Indian Ocean) since 1992
- Salaberry-de-Valleyfield in Quebec, Canada since 1998
- Baia Mare in Romania since September 5, 2009.

== See also ==
- Communes of the Seine-et-Marne department
