= Canton of Combs-la-Ville =

Coordinates: 48°38′02″N 2°35′02″E

Combs-la-Ville
- Canton
- Country: France
- Region: Île-de-France
- Department: Seine-et-Marne
- No. of communes: {{{nbcomm}}}
- Area: 73.98 km^{2} (28.56 sq mi)
- Population (2023): 77,008
  - Density: 1,041/km^{2} (2,696/sq mi)
- INSEE code: 77 04

The canton of Combs-la-Ville is a French administrative division, located in the arrondissement of Melun, in the Seine-et-Marne département (Île-de-France région).

== Composition ==
At the French canton reorganisation which came into effect in March 2015, the canton was expanded from 4 to 5 communes:

- Brie-Comte-Robert
- Combs-la-Ville
- Lieusaint
- Moissy-Cramayel
- Réau

== Demographics ==
Historical population
Year	Pop.	±% p.a.
2013	68,923	—
2018	73,195	+1.21%
Source: INSEE

== See also ==
- Cantons of the Seine-et-Marne department
- Communes of the Seine-et-Marne department
