= Lieusaint, Seine-et-Marne =

Lieusaint
- Commune
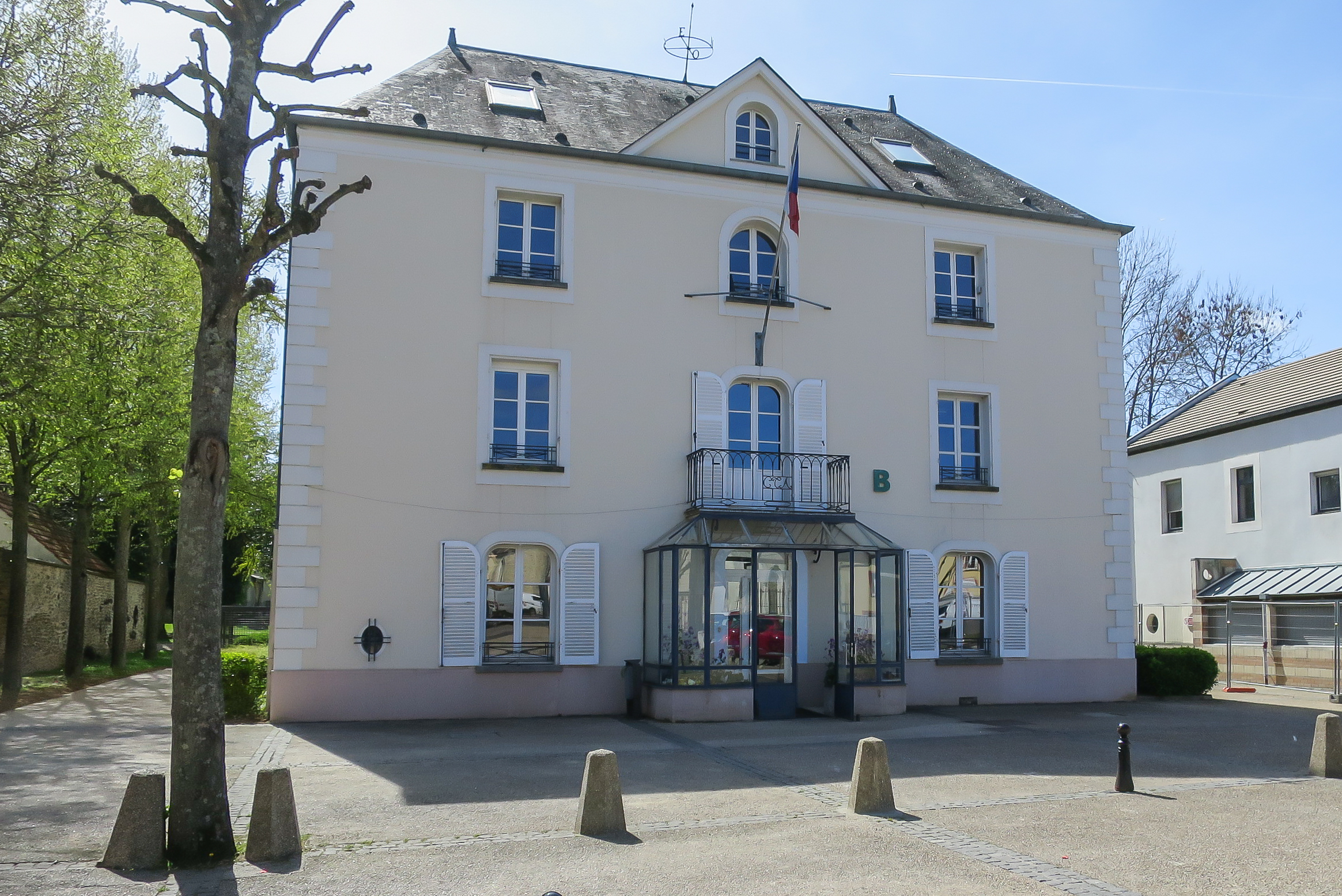
- The town hall in Lieusaint
- Location of Lieusaint
- Location within France Location within Île-de-France (region)
- Coordinates: 48°38′00″N 2°33′00″E
- Country: France
- Region: Île-de-France
- Department: Seine-et-Marne
- Arrondissement: Melun
- Canton: Combs-la-Ville
- Intercommunality: CA Grand Paris Sud Seine-Essonne-Sénart

Government
  - Mayor (2020–2026): Michel Bisson
- Area^{1}: 11.97 km^{2} (4.62 sq mi)
- Highest elevation: 91 m (299 ft)
- Lowest elevation: 81 m (266 ft)
- Population (2023): 14,017
  - Density: 1,171/km^{2} (3,033/sq mi)
- Time zone: UTC+01:00 (CET)
  - Summer (DST): UTC+02:00 (CEST)
- INSEE/Postal code: 77251 /77127
- ^{1} French Land Register data, which excludes lakes, ponds, glaciers > 1 km^{2} (0.386 sq mi or 247 acres) and river estuaries.

Lieusaint (French: [ljøsɛ̃]) is a commune in the Seine-et-Marne department in the Île-de-France region in north-central France.

== Demographics ==
The inhabitants are called Lieusaintais in French.

Historical population
Year	Pop.	±% p.a.
1968	800	—
1975	657	−2.77%
1982	510	−3.55%
1990	5,200	+33.68%
1999	6,365	+2.27%
2007	9,783	+5.52%
2012	10,508	+1.44%
2017	13,291	+4.81%
2023	14,017	+0.89%
Source: INSEE

== See also ==
- Communes of the Seine-et-Marne department
