= Le Mée-sur-Seine =

- Commune
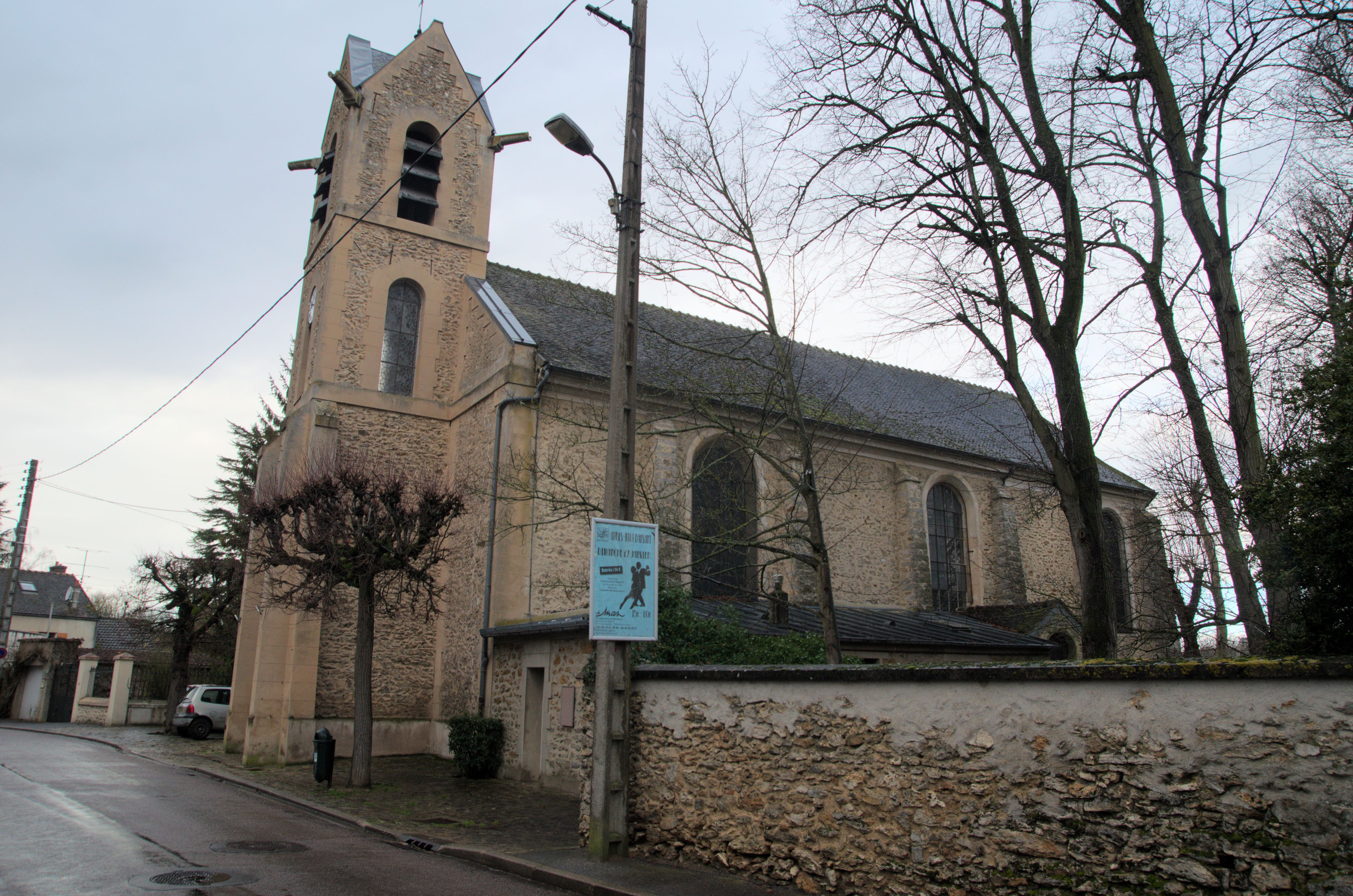
- The church in Le Mée-sur-Seine

- Coat of arms

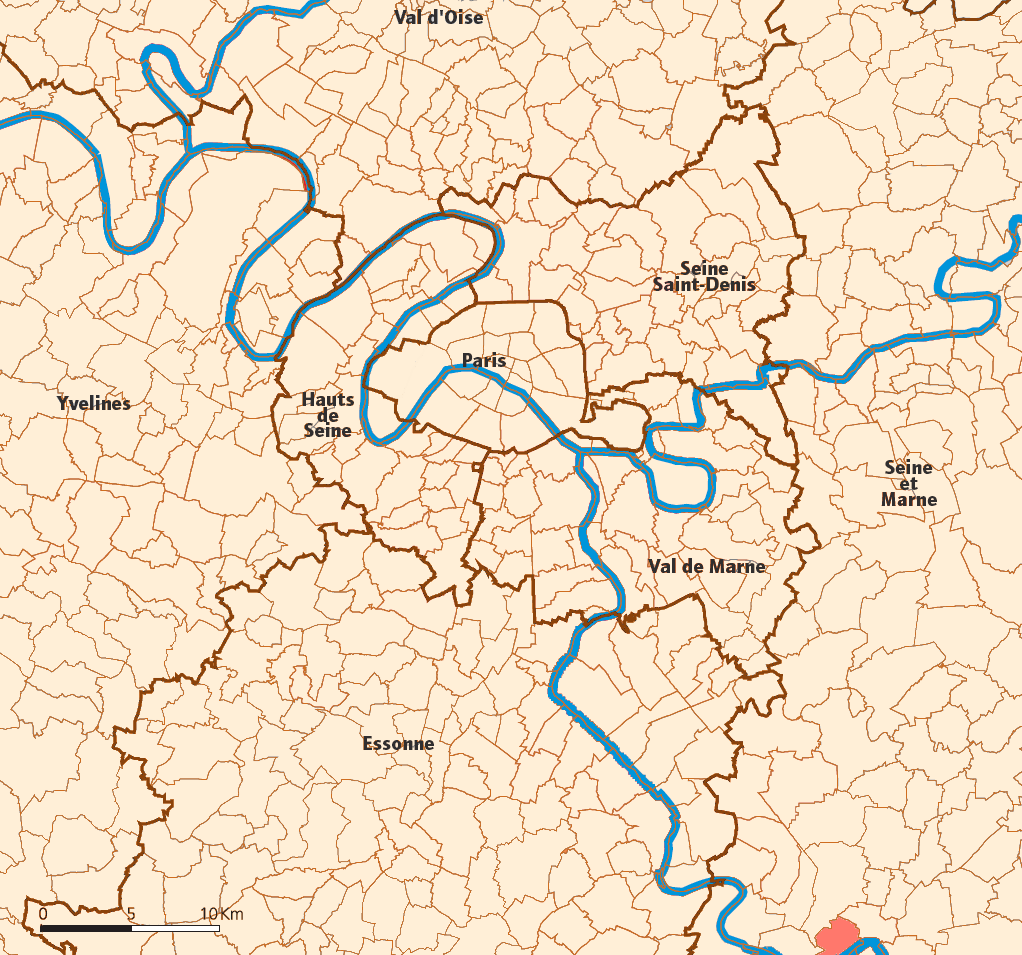
- Location (in red) within Paris inner and outer suburbs
- Location of Le Mée-sur-Seine
- Location within France Location within Île-de-France (region)
- Coordinates: 48°32′00″N 2°37′44″E
- Country: France
- Region: Île-de-France
- Department: Seine-et-Marne
- Arrondissement: Melun
- Canton: Savigny-le-Temple
- Intercommunality: CA Melun Val de Seine

Government
  - Mayor (2020–2026): Franck Vernin
- Area^{1}: 5.34 km^{2} (2.06 sq mi)
- Highest elevation: 80 m (260 ft)
- Lowest elevation: 37 m (121 ft)
- Population (2023): 19,527
  - Density: 3,660/km^{2} (9,470/sq mi)
- Time zone: UTC+01:00 (CET)
  - Summer (DST): UTC+02:00 (CEST)
- INSEE/Postal code: 77285 /77350
- ^{1} French Land Register data, which excludes lakes, ponds, glaciers > 1 km^{2} (0.386 sq mi or 247 acres) and river estuaries.

Le Mée-sur-Seine (French pronunciation: [lə me syʁ sɛn], literally Le Mée on Seine) is a commune in the Seine-et-Marne department in the Île-de-France region in north-central France, next to Melun. It is located in the south-eastern suburbs of Paris 41.1 km (25.5 mi) from the center.

== Geography ==
The town is located on the right side of the Seine on a limestone plateau.

== History ==
The Hôtel de Ville

- B.C.: the Sénons (Gaul tribe) may have lived here.
- 13th century: Le Mée-sur-Seine is mentioned for the first time by "Mas" in 1253. "Mas" is an old French term for farm.
- 15th century: castle of "Marchémarais"
- September, 30th, 1833: birth of Henri Chapu, a famous sculptor.
- 1889: construction of the "Église Notre-Dame-de-la-Nativité".
- 1845: first railway.
- 1938: Originally called simply "Le Mée", the name of the commune became officially "Le Mée-sur-Seine" (meaning "Le Mée upon Seine")
- 1944: Liberation of the town by allied troops who crossed the Seine using a float-bridge (the only bridge had been destroyed by the Germans).
- 1959: opening of Valpan Laboratories (now the Hôtel de Ville)
- 1970-1971: construction of the main road to Melun (la pénétrante).
- 1979: opening of the new rail station.

The town grew quickly after World War II, and it is now divided in four districts: Le Mée Village, Plein Ciel, Croix Blanche, Les Courtilleraies.

== Demographics ==
Inhabitants are called Méens in French.

Historical population

Year	Pop.	±% p.a.
1793	238	—
1800	301	+3.41%
1806	281	−1.14%
1821	332	+1.12%
1831	401	+1.91%
1836	475	+3.45%
1841	483	+0.33%
1846	590	+4.08%
1851	617	+0.90%
1856	577	−1.33%
1861	650	+2.41%
1866	656	+0.18%
1872	674	+0.45%
1876	634	−1.52%
1881	720	+2.58%
1886	813	+2.46%
1891	792	−0.52%
1896	701	−2.41%
1901	650	−1.50%

Year	Pop.	±% p.a.
1906	653	+0.09%
1911	624	−0.90%
1921	678	+0.83%
1926	754	+2.15%
1931	839	+2.16%
1936	875	+0.84%
1946	1,040	+1.74%
1954	1,220	+2.02%
1962	1,391	+1.65%
1968	4,426	+21.28%
1975	10,056	+12.44%
1982	13,917	+4.75%
1990	20,933	+5.24%
1999	21,217	+0.15%
2007	20,844	−0.22%
2012	20,577	−0.26%
2017	20,816	+0.23%
2023	19,527	−1.06%

Source: EHESS and INSEE (1968-2023)

== Education ==
There are 11 infant schools, 8 grade schools, 2 secondary schools and 1 high school.

== Culture ==
- "Le Mas": library and auditorium.
- "Espace Cordier": Youth House for Culture.

== Religions ==
- "Église Notre-Dame-de-la-Nativité" ("Village" District), built from 1889 to 1893, is on the location of the previous church (built in 1771).
- chapel "Sainte-Croix" ("Croix-Blanche" District)

== Economy ==
Business	Number of firms (June 2003)
Industry	26
Agriculture	2
Trade	104
Construction	48
Transports	12
Services to firms	85
Services to particular	77
Other	195
TOTAL	549

- Unemployment rate (1999): 12.8%
- Private income (2004): €15,136/year

== Transport ==
Le Mée-sur-Seine is served by the station of the same name on Paris's RER line, approximately 45 minutes from the centre of Paris. Local bus network: Bus TRAM: lines B, F, J, J1, M.

== People ==
- Jacques Philippe Avice (1759–1835), general, and also tile maker around 1820.
- François-Joseph Talma (1763–1826), actor, he was also co-owner of the tile manufactory.
- Mademoiselle Mars (1779–1847), actress, she was also co-owner of the tile manufactory.
- Charles-Tristan de Montholon (1782–1853), general and politician, he was also co-owner of the tile manufactory.
- Grigore Alexandru Ghica (1807–1857), prince of Moldavia (1849–1853 and 1854–1856) committed suicide in Le Mée on August 24, 1857. His wife and five other relatives are interred close to him in a memorial in the town cemetery. Close to this memorial, four other members of the family (including Nicolas Jean Ghika (1849–1873), killed during a duel at Fontainebleau) are interred.
- Henri Chapu, famous sculptor, was born in "Le Mée" on 30 September 1833. He was interred on 24 April 1891.
- Firmin-Girard (1838–1921), painter. He has been interred close to Henri Chapu.
- Henri-Auguste Patey (1855–1930), sculptor, student of Henri Chapu.
- Gaston Carraud (1864–1920), songwriter, student of Jules Massenet, was born in "Le Mée" on 20 July 1864.
- Renée Saint-Cyr (1904–2004), actress, lived in a big 18th century house in "Le Mée".
- Karl Lagerfeld (1933-2019), designer
- Caroline de Monaco and Ernest-Auguste de Hanovre own the house previously occupied by Karl Lagerfeld.
- Nina Roberts (1979-), ex-porn star
- Willy Denzey (1982-) singer

== See also ==
- Communes of the Seine-et-Marne department
