= Boissise-la-Bertrand =

- Commune
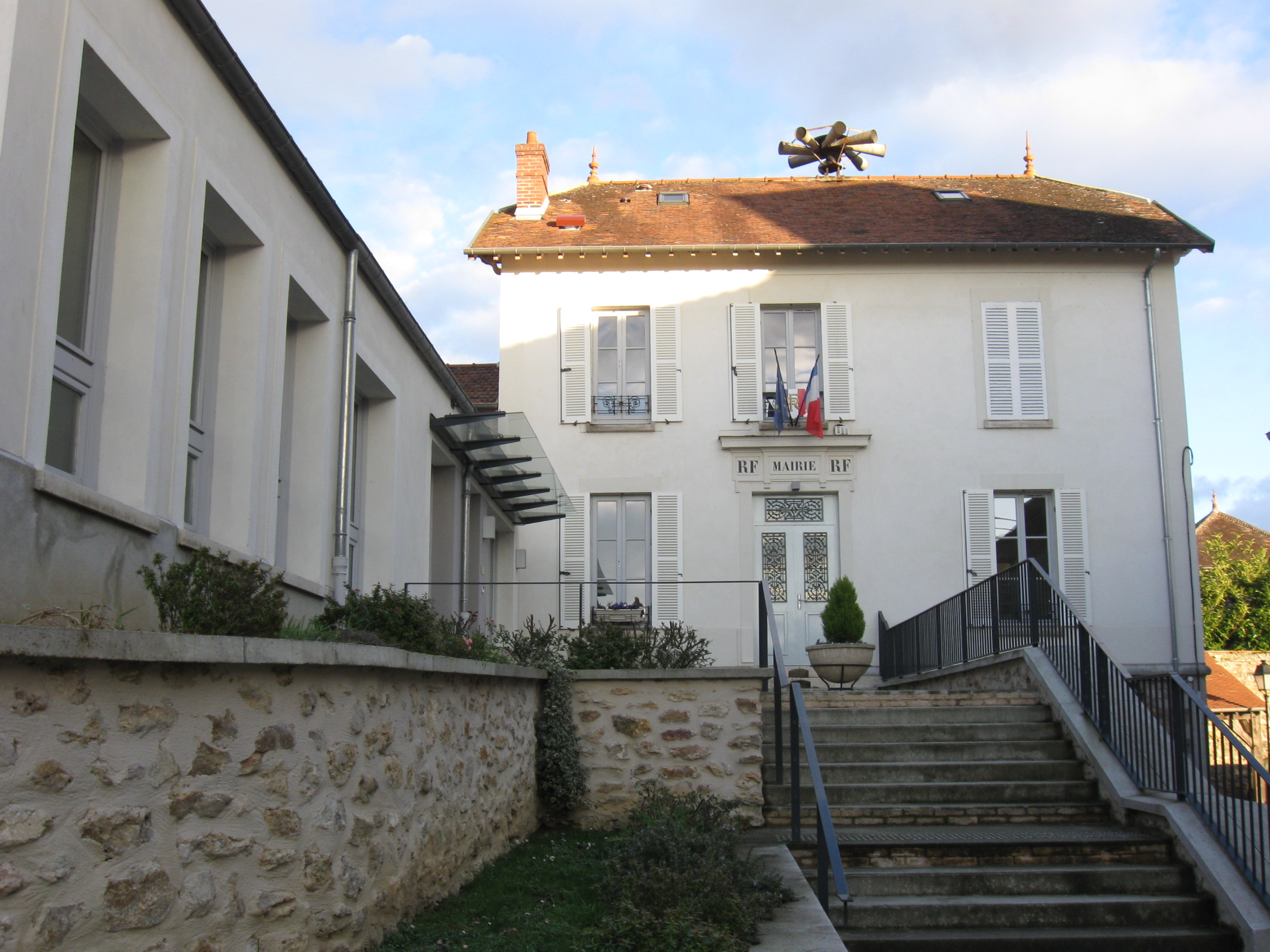
- The town hall in Boissise-la-Bertrand
- Location of Boissise-la-Bertrand
- Location within France Location within Île-de-France (region)
- Coordinates: 48°31′39″N 2°35′19″E
- Country: France
- Region: Île-de-France
- Department: Seine-et-Marne
- Arrondissement: Melun
- Canton: Savigny-le-Temple
- Intercommunality: CA Melun Val de Seine

Government
  - Mayor (2020–2026): Olivier Delmer
- Area^{1}: 7.95 km^{2} (3.07 sq mi)
- Highest elevation: 81 m (266 ft)
- Lowest elevation: 37 m (121 ft)
- Population (2023): 1,206
  - Density: 152/km^{2} (393/sq mi)
- Time zone: UTC+01:00 (CET)
  - Summer (DST): UTC+02:00 (CEST)
- INSEE/Postal code: 77039 /77350
- ^{1} French Land Register data, which excludes lakes, ponds, glaciers > 1 km^{2} (0.386 sq mi or 247 acres) and river estuaries.

Boissise-la-Bertrand (French pronunciation: [bwasiz la bɛʁtʁɑ̃]) is a commune in the Seine-et-Marne department in the Île-de-France region in north-central France.

== Demographics ==
The inhabitants are called Boissisiens.

== See also ==
- Communes of the Seine-et-Marne department
