= Vert-Saint-Denis =

- Commune
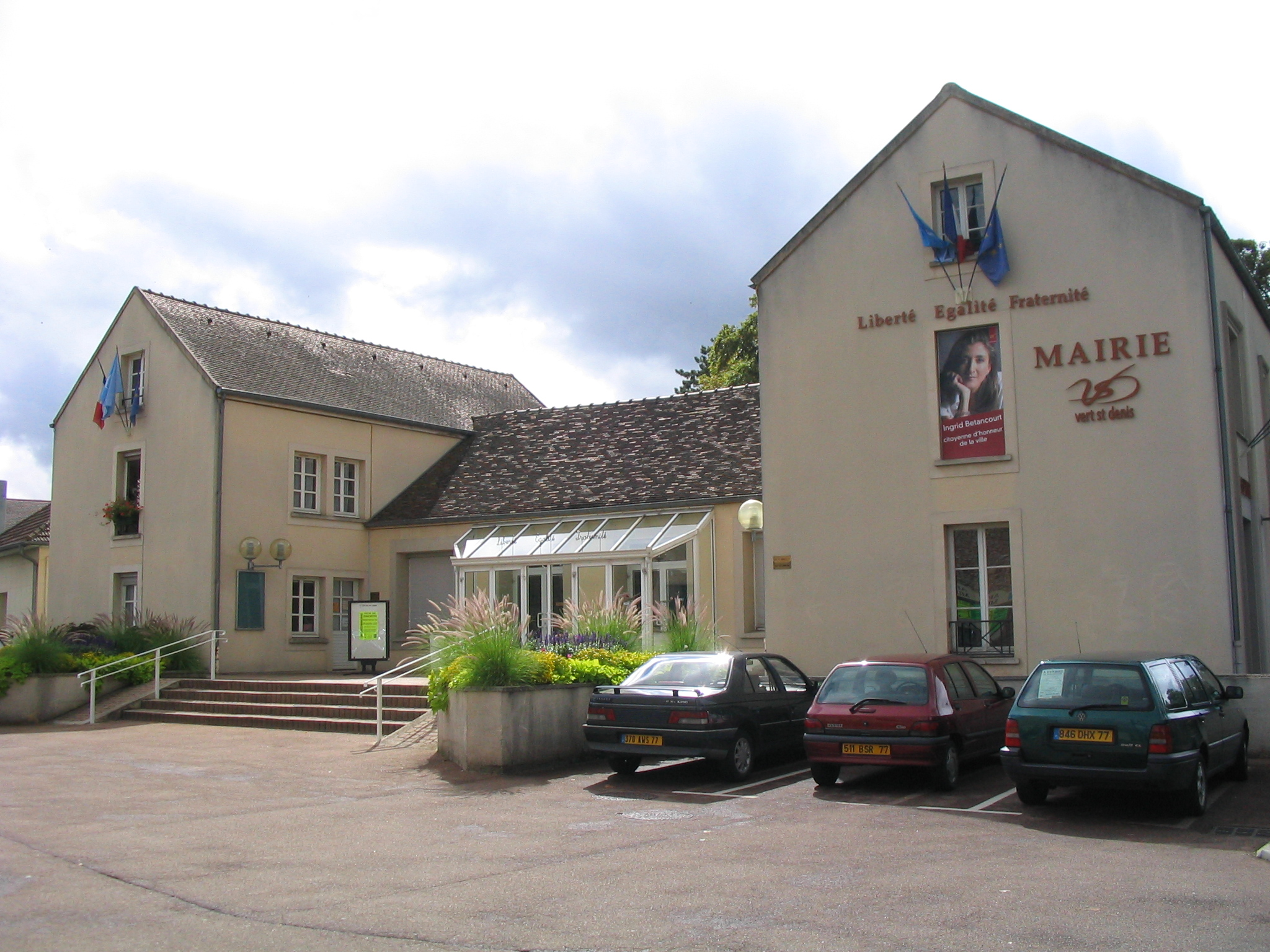
- The town hall in Vert-Saint-Denis

- Coat of arms
- Location of Vert-Saint-Denis
- Location within France Location within Île-de-France (region)
- Coordinates: 48°33′54″N 2°36′53″E
- Country: France
- Region: Île-de-France
- Department: Seine-et-Marne
- Arrondissement: Melun
- Canton: Savigny-le-Temple
- Intercommunality: CA Grand Paris Sud Seine-Essonne-Sénart

Government
  - Mayor (2020–2026): Éric Bareille
- Area^{1}: 16.13 km^{2} (6.23 sq mi)
- Highest elevation: 105 m (344 ft)
- Lowest elevation: 70 m (230 ft)
- Population (2023): 9,291
  - Density: 576.0/km^{2} (1,492/sq mi)
- Time zone: UTC+01:00 (CET)
  - Summer (DST): UTC+02:00 (CEST)
- INSEE/Postal code: 77495 /77240
- ^{1} French Land Register data, which excludes lakes, ponds, glaciers > 1 km^{2} (0.386 sq mi or 247 acres) and river estuaries.

Vert-Saint-Denis (French pronunciation: [vɛʁ sɛ̃ dəni]) is a commune in the Seine-et-Marne department in the Île-de-France region in north-central France.

== Demographics ==
Inhabitants of Vert-Saint-Denis are called Verdyonisiens in French.

Historical population
Year	Pop.	±% p.a.
1968	2,799	—
1975	3,896	+4.84%
1982	4,458	+1.94%
1990	7,368	+6.48%
1999	7,493	+0.19%
2007	7,081	−0.70%
2012	7,007	−0.21%
2017	7,610	+1.66%
2023	9,291	+3.38%
Source: INSEE

== See also ==
- Communes of the Seine-et-Marne department
