= Cesson =

- Commune
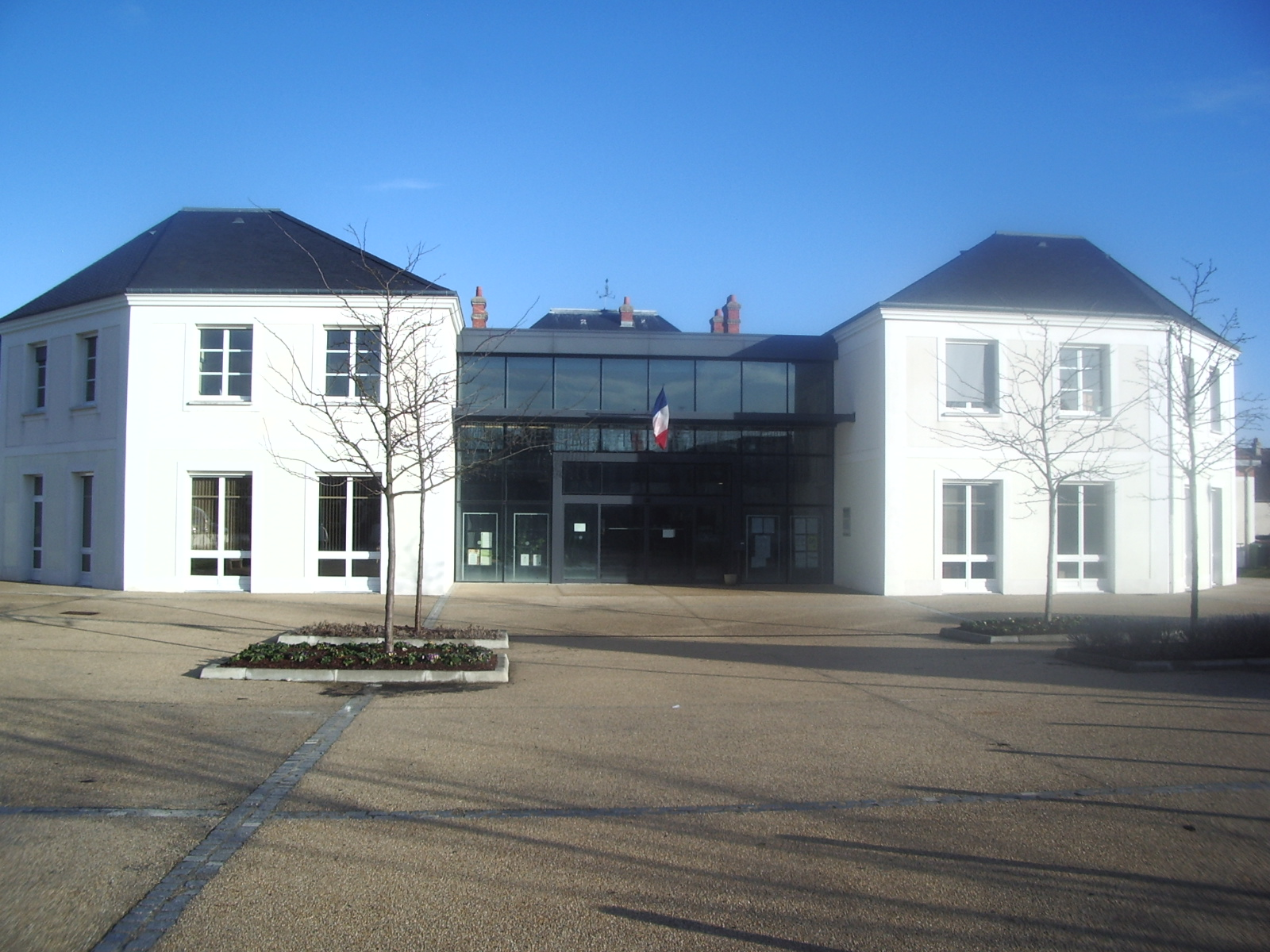
- The town hall in Cesson
- Location of Cesson
- Location within France Location within Île-de-France (region)
- Coordinates: 48°33′48″N 2°36′19″E
- Country: France
- Region: Île-de-France
- Department: Seine-et-Marne
- Arrondissement: Melun
- Canton: Savigny-le-Temple
- Intercommunality: CA Grand Paris Sud Seine-Essonne-Sénart

Government
  - Mayor (2020–2026): Olivier Chaplet
- Area^{1}: 6.98 km^{2} (2.69 sq mi)
- Highest elevation: 86 m (282 ft)
- Lowest elevation: 62 m (203 ft)
- Population (2023): 11,222
  - Density: 1,610/km^{2} (4,160/sq mi)
- Time zone: UTC+01:00 (CET)
  - Summer (DST): UTC+02:00 (CEST)
- INSEE/Postal code: 77067 /77240
- ^{1} French Land Register data, which excludes lakes, ponds, glaciers > 1 km^{2} (0.386 sq mi or 247 acres) and river estuaries.

Cesson (French pronunciation: [sɛsɔ̃]) is a commune in the Seine-et-Marne department in the Île-de-France region in north-central France.

== Demographics ==
The inhabitants are called Cessonnais in French.

Historical population
Year	Pop.	±% p.a.
1968	2,283	—
1975	4,948	+11.68%
1982	7,522	+6.17%
1990	7,878	+0.58%
1999	7,699	−0.26%
2007	7,728	+0.05%
2012	9,332	+3.84%
2017	10,418	+2.23%
2023	11,222	+1.25%
Source: INSEE

== See also ==
- Communes of the Seine-et-Marne department
