= Darren Woolley =

Australian marketing consultant

Darren Woolley is an Australian marketing consultant. He is founder and CEO of TrinityP3, an Australian marketing management consulting company. He is chair of the board of the Australian Marketing Institute. Since 2005 he has often been included in the Australian AdNews "Power 50" ranking.

== Career ==
After graduation, Woolley worked for six years on muscle and nerve diseases in the neuropathology laboratory of the Melbourne Royal Children's Hospital. For fifteen years he worked in various advertising agencies; he founded TrinityP3 in 2000.

Woolley was appointed to the board of the Australian Marketing Institute on 23 October 2014 and elected chair of the board in January 2015.

== Published works ==
- Top 50 Marketing Management Posts of 2014: The Marketing Management Book of the Year ISBN 9781925171969
- April 13, 1984 - Festschrift for Alan Llewelyn Williams MD BS FRCPA proceedings of a scientific meeting arranged by the Department of Pathology, Royal Children's Hospital, Melbourne
