= Monument to Feodor Chaliapin =

Statue in Ufa, Bashkortostan, Russia

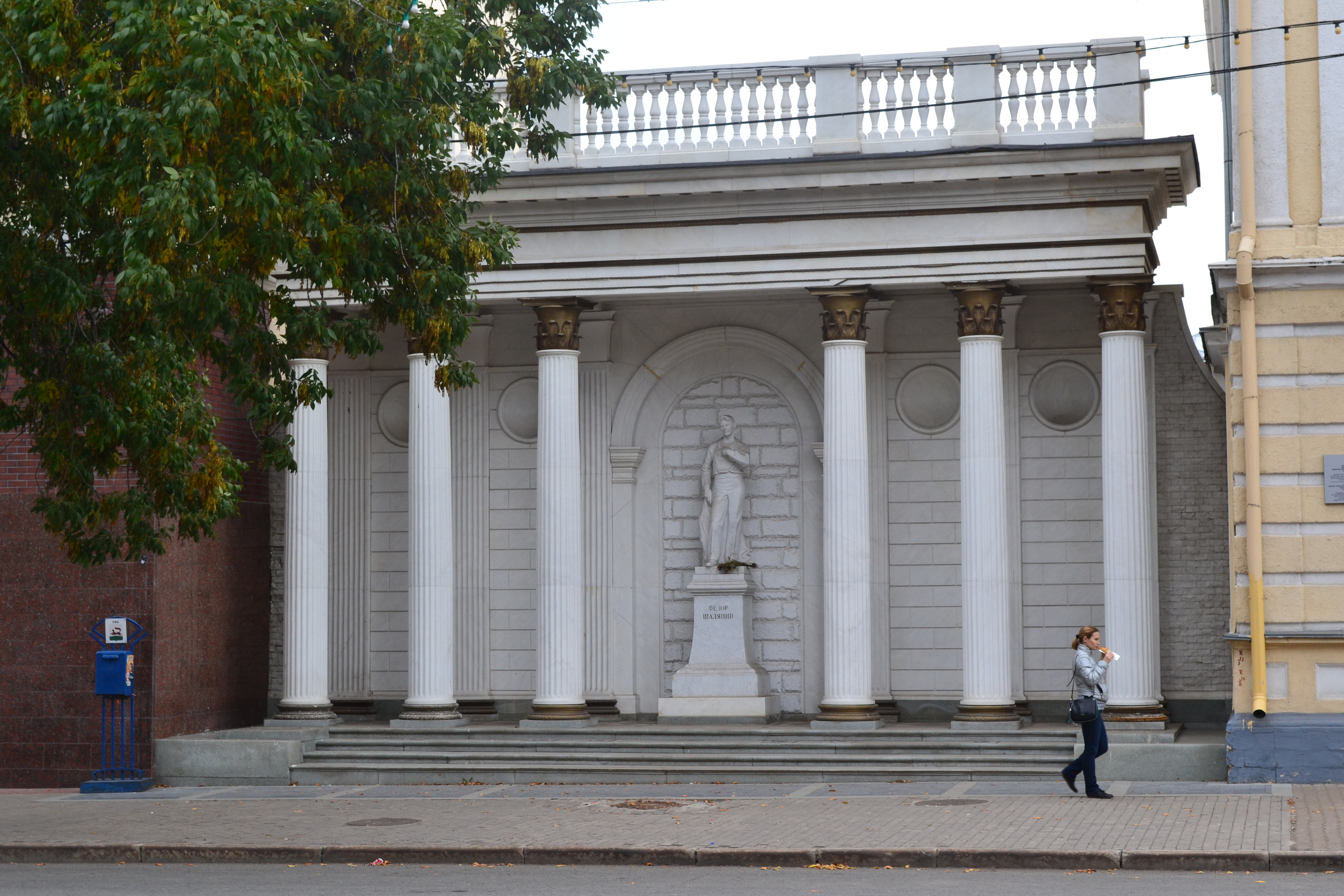
- Interactive map of Monument to Feodor Chaliapin
- Location: Bashkortostan, Ufa
- Coordinates: 55.7223°N 55.9457°E
- Opening date: 2007
- Dedicated to: Feodor Chaliapin

A monument to Feodor Chaliapin stands at the Noble Assembly House in Ufa, Russia, since 2007.

== Description ==
The sculpture depicts a young Feodor Chaliapin, as he made his debut on the Ufa stage. The sculptor is Rustem Hasanov.

The Chaliapin monument was unveiled in 2007 to mark the 135th anniversary of the singer's birth.
