= TrinityP3 =

TrinityP3 is an independent strategic marketing management consulting company founded by Darren Woolley in Melbourne, Australia in 2000. Up until 2007 the company was known as P3.

The company is best known for finding the right agency for a given brand with their agency search and selection services. It provides budgeting, benchmarking and company stats tracking and assesses company processes and environmental impacts. Its head office is located in Sydney, Australia, with offices also in Melbourne, Singapore, and Hong Kong.

== Award sponsorship ==
TrinityP3 is the sponsor of the Future Leader Award 2015 for the Australian Marketing Institute. The award promotes marketing leaders and the pivotal role they will play in Australian organisations in the future.

== Innovations and designs ==
- Calibr8or is a capabilities benchmarking resource tool used to assess media agencies around their capabilities.
- Ad Cost Checker was launched in April 2014. It is an online advertising cost benchmarking calculator that allows business to benchmark their hourly rates and fees for creative, media, digital, social, design and advertising production.
- Resource Rate Calculator is a free industry calculator used to calculate resource rates such as annual salaries, annual billable hours, head hour rates, overhead and profit markup.
- Evalu8ing is an online survey tool for evaluating the status of the complex relationships between media agencies and their clients.
