= Harry Lubin =

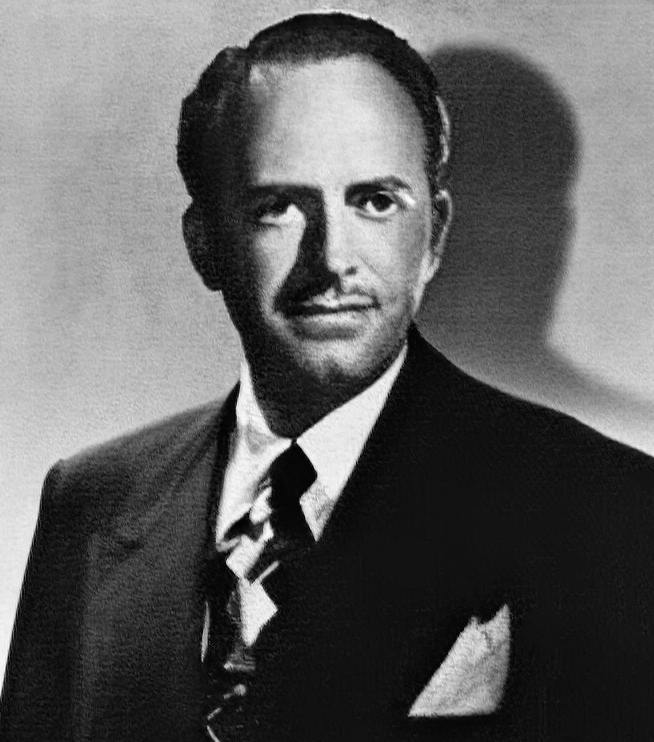

Background information
- Born: March 5, 1906; New York City, New York, U.S.
- Died: July 21, 1977 (aged 71) Los Angeles, California, U.S.
- Occupations: Composer; arranger; pianist
- Instrument: Piano

Harry Lubin (March 5, 1906 – July 21, 1977) was an American composer, arranger, and pianist. He is known for composing the theme and much of the music for the second season of the television series The Outer Limits and One Step Beyond.

== Biography ==
Lubin's professional career spanned over 40 years, as a composer and conductor in many Broadway productions and recordings, the concert stage, in radio, television and motion pictures. He worked with many top names in entertainment, including Jan Peerce, Robert Merrill, Robert Weade, Selma Kaye, Al Jolson, Eddie Cantor, Dinah Shore, Fran Warren, and Connie Haines.

=== Early years ===
Lubin was born Harris Loigsoltz in the Lower East Side of Manhattan on March 5, 1906. His father Louis Loigsoltz was an immigrant Jewish musician born in Uman, Russian Empire (today in Ukraine), and his mother was Celia Epstein; the family later changed their name to Lubin. Harry began his career in 1925, as piano accompanist for basso Feodor Chaliapin. By age 20, he became the musical director of the Irving Place Theatre in New York. He left Irving Place to become one of the youngest musical directors in the foreign department of the Aeolian, Vocalian, and later, the Brunswick Phonograph Company.

=== Theater and film ===
Lubin composed and arranged for numerous productions including The Eternal Mother in 1928 and Max Gordon's Making Mary in 1932. He worked with Samuel Roxy Rothafel at his theatre, and later at NBC. He joined the Advertisers Broadcasters Company as musical director in 1938, working on up to 28 shows each week during his seven-year tenure, returning to Broadway in 1942 to compose the music for Sidney Kingsley's play The Patriot.

=== Radio and television ===
In January 1945, Lubin became the musical director of the radio program Glamour Manor, starring Kenny Baker. His work on television included being musical director for Those Two on NBC (1951-1953). He was musical director for the first Pinky Lee Show, which he stayed with until the program went off the air in 1953.

Lubin composed "Letter to Loretta", the theme for The Loretta Young Show, for which he was musical director. He also composed the theme for Dick Powell's Zane Grey Theatre.

Lubin composed music for the sci-fi television programs, One Step Beyond and The Outer Limits, where he pioneered an effective combination of orchestra, theremin and female voice. Varèse Sarabande released the album "One Step Beyond" (STV 81120), with music from the soundtrack of that program.

Music publisher CPM (formerly Carlin Recorded Music Library, now part of Warner/Chappell Production Music) acquired Lubin's publishing company, Harrose, in 2005.
