= Bauman Street, Kazan =

Street in Kazan, Russia

Coordinates: 55°47′14″N 49°07′18″E

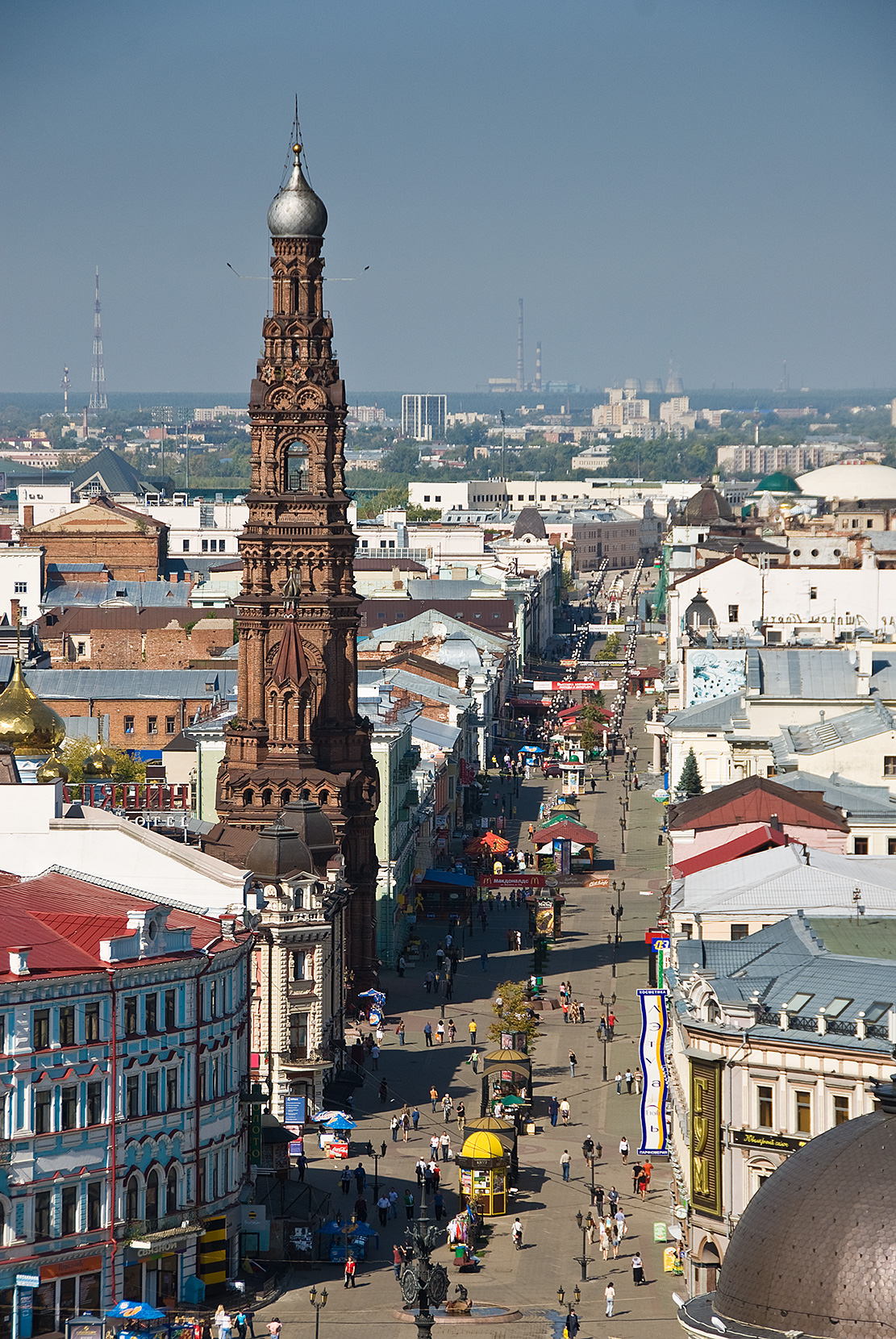
View of Bauman Street, September 2009

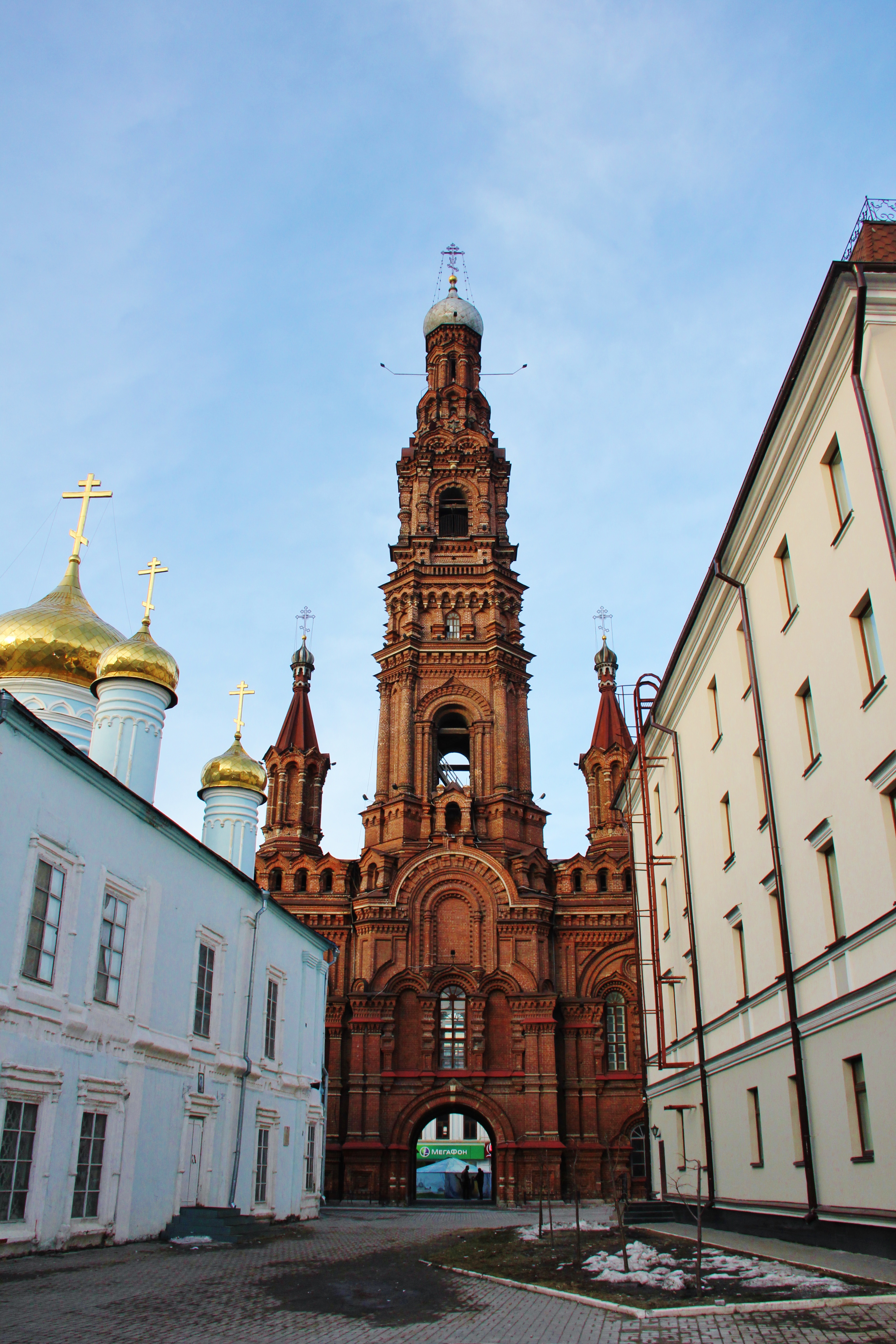
The belltower of Epiphany Church, a landmark on Bauman Street

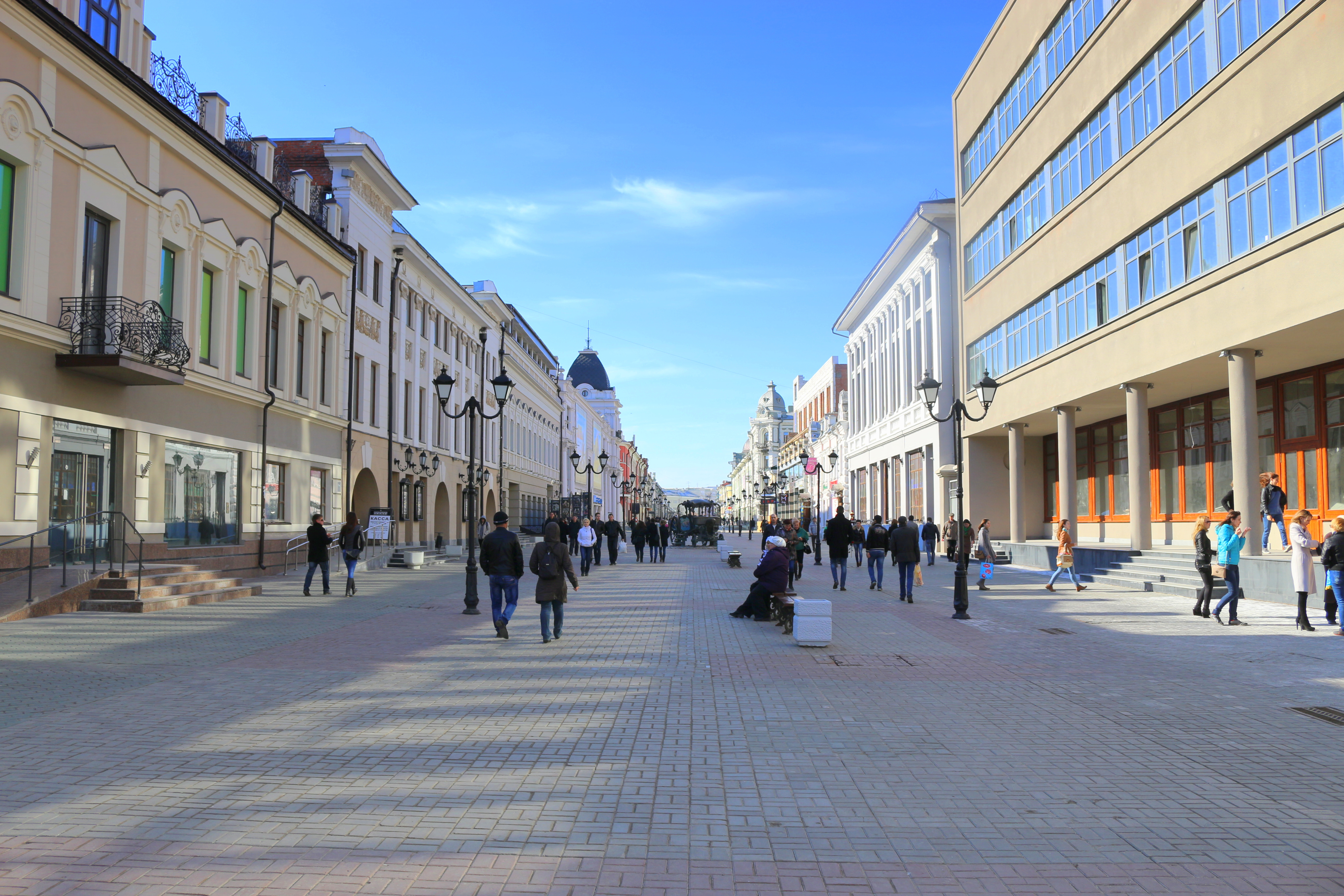
View of Bauman Street

Bauman Street (Russian: улица Баумана, romanized: ulitsa Baumana; Tatar: Бауман урамы, romanized: Bauman uramı) is a pedestrian street in the heart of Kazan, the capital of Tatarstan, Russia. It is named after Nikolay Bauman, a Russian revolutionary, and is located in the central part of the city. The street starts at the foot of the Kremlin and reaches Tukay Square, the central square in the city.

Bauman Street is paved with multicoloured bricks; some benches and two lines of lanterns are set there. There are also planted lindens on the street. Different fairs and festive presentations are held on Bauman Street.

== History ==
Bauman Street has long been regarded a trading centre and featured a concentration of the main mercantile establishments of the city. The street was the second most significant street of Kazan's central district. It was famous for its banks and notary offices, different shops, drugstores, and hotels. At the beginning of the twentieth century there was a shop in every building.

Bauman Street has existed since the 15th century. It ran from the Khan's Palace at the edge of the city. In ancient times the Nogayskaya Road was there. At the end of the 16th century, the street was named Prolomnaya (literally Breach Street) and later it was renamed Bolshaya Prolomnaya (literally Greater Breach Street; there was also Malaya Prolomnaya (Lesser Breach) Street, now known as Profsoyuznaya Street). It was named for the two breaches of the Kremlin wall, which were made as the result of the explosions of the tower Nur-Ali and Lower Nogaysky gates during the siege of the Kremlin by the troops of Ivan the Terrible in 1552.

Later the street was named Bogoyavlenskaya (Epiphany) after the church, which was built in 1731-1756.

Famous Russian singer Fyodor Shalyapin was baptised in Bogoyavlenskaya Church. Nowadays there is a statue of Shalyapin on Bauman Street, near the church. It is the only such statue in the world.

In 1930, the street was named Bauman Street in honour of the famous local revolutionary hero Nikolay Bauman. He was born in 1873 and graduated from the Kazan Veterinary Institute.

== Alley of Tatar Stars ==
In 2002, singer Salawat Fätxetdinov proposed the creation of an "Alley of Tatar Stars" (Russian: Аллея татарских звезд), and the first stars were unveiled on August 29, 2003, on Kazan's City Day, honoring Älfiyä Avzalova and Ilham Şakirov, famous Tatar estrada singers. In 2004, the opera singer Xäydär Bigiçev received a star, and in 2005 the singers Mönirä Bulatova and Salawat Fätxetdinov were honored. Generally the stars are dedicated to theatre and movie artists as well as musicians.

== See also ==
- Epiphany Cathedral (Kazan, Russia)
