= Epiphany Cathedral (Kazan, Russia) =

Orthodox Church in Tatarstan, Russia

- Epiphany Cathedral
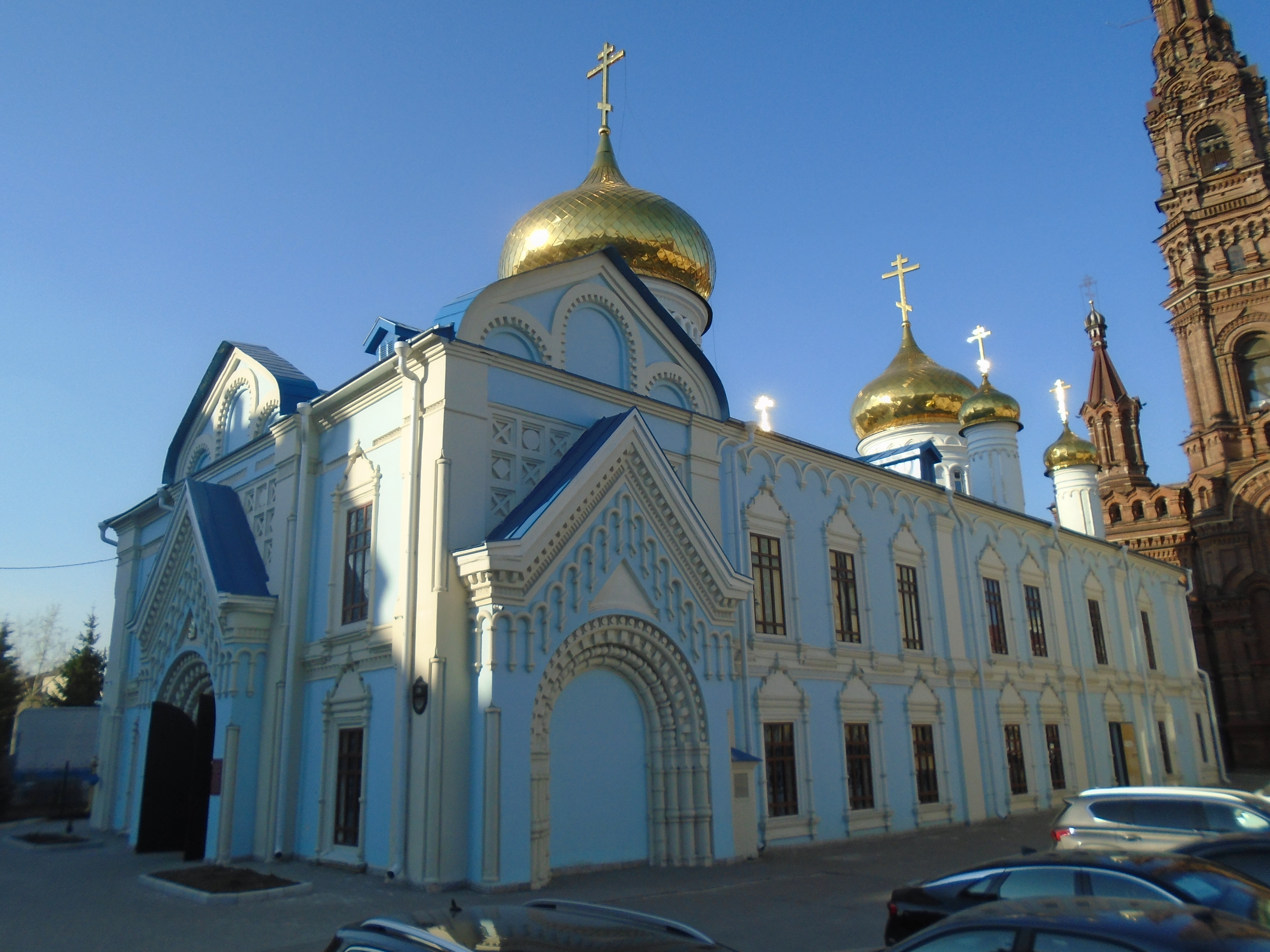
- Epiphany Cathedral
- 55°47′17″N 49°07′08″E
- Location: Kazan, the Republic of Tatarstan
- Country: Russia
- Denomination: Orthodox Christian church
- Website: https://tatmitropolia.ru/hramy_tatarstana/kazan_eparhiya/kazan/?id=44612

History
- Status: Cathedral
- Consecrated: 1904

Architecture
- Functional status: Active
- Heritage designation: Object of cultural heritage of Russia
- Architectural type: Church
- Style: Russian Baroque (cathedral); Russian Revival style (bell tower)
- Years built: 1731—1756
- Groundbreaking: 17th century: Wooden church construction
- Completed: 1701: St. Andrew's Church Addition 1731-1756: Stone church and bell tower construction 1893-1897: New bell tower construction 1997: Return of the cathedral to the Russian Orthodox Church
- Closed: 1935: Closure
- Demolished: 1909: The old bell tower demolition 1930s: St. Andrew's Church demolition

Specifications
- Materials: Brick

Administration
- Diocese: Tatarstan and Kazan diocese

The Epiphany Cathedral (Tatar: Богоявление чиркәве) is an Orthodox church located in the Kazan subdistrict and is part of the Kazan and Tatarstan Diocese. The church is situated in the Vakhitovsky district of Kazan on Bauman Street. Its bell tower is a prominent landmark of the city and a monument of religious architecture.

== History ==
The Epiphany wooden church was built in the place of the old Prolomny Gate in the 17th century. The adjacent Novaya Sloboda, also known as the Epiphany Sloboda, was built along Prolomnaya Street.

The Church of St. Andrew the First-Called was built in 1701 next to the Church of the Epiphany.

The stone church of the Epiphany and the belltower were built by merchants Ivan Afanasievich Mikhlyaev and Sergey Alexandrovich Chernov in 1731-1756. In 1741 the church was destroyed by fire and only the walls remained. It is believed that the construction of the stone church began after the fire. The construction of the temple was completed in 1756 with the addition of the refectory to the Epiphany Church, which almost doubled its size.

Thus in the 18th century the Epiphany complex was built. It consisted of the main church, a heated winter church named after St. Andrew the First-Called on the northern side, a low two-storey bell tower with a hipped roof on the side of Ostrovsky Street, a clergy house built at the end of the 18th century on the western side and another house of the church on the Bolshaya Prolomnaya Street's side (where nowadays the Chaliapin Monument is situated).

In the pre-revolutionary period the Epiphany parish was one of the largest in Kazan. Among its members there were not only ordinary citizens, but also the aristocracy and prominent salesmen.

In 1892, Ivan Semyonovich Krivonosov (1810-1892), deputy director of the Kazan City Public Bank, honorary citizen of Kazan merchant of the first guild, died. He bequeathed 35,000 rubles to the Epiphany Church, where he was a lider in 1852-1863. His will stipulated that 25,000 rubles of this sum should be used for the construction of a new bell tower.

In July 1893, the newspaper "Volzhsky Vestnik" announced a competition for the best design of a new bell tower in the Russian Revival style. It was expected that the project would be about 32 fathoms high.

The authorship of the new bell tower is disputed due to the loss of the original design with the author's signature. According to some sources it was the architect Heinrich Rusch, according to others it belonged to the architect and construction manager Mikhail Mikhailov. G.B. Rusch, who submitted the project and received a 150 rubles prize, was named the winner of the competition in Soviet local history publications. After the publication of B. Yerunov's research in 1986, post-Soviet publications named M. D. Mikhailov as the author of the bell tower project. The Kazan archives have also preserved documents on the dispute between Rush and Mikhailov over the authorship of the project.

The project of the bell tower was exhibited at the All-Russia Exhibition 1896.

Construction of the new bell tower began on November 24, 1893, but only the foundation was laid and excavation was done to a depth of five fathoms from the surface. Construction resumed in the spring of 1895 and the bell tower was completed on August 17, 1897. The scaffolding was then removed.

The old bells were the first to be hung in the bell tower. The heaviest of them weighed 217 poods and 32 pounds. On October 1, 1900, a new bell weighing 526 poods was ceremoniously hoisted into the bell tower and delivered to the city by rail. On the same day, a two-meter octagonal gilded iron cross weighing 17 poods was installed.

Newspaper reports of the time indicate that the bell tower was built with almost two million bricks and its final cost was 50,000 rubles, 10,000 of which was spent on deep foundations. The 1907 statement of the Epiphany Church records that the bell tower was built with a donation of 30,000 rubles from Kazan merchant Krivonosov, and the remaining 1,000 rubles came from church funds.

The bell tower of the Epiphany Church has gained independent architectural value and has become more famous than the church itself. It is the highest bell tower in Kazan and one of the highest Orthodox church bell towers in the world.

The register of the Epiphany Church states that "on the second storey of the bell tower there was a room for a church apparatus in memory of the benefactor Krivonosov, who contributed to the construction of the bell tower. In 1902 in this room a temple was installed and consecrated on May 20, 1904 in memory of the 3rd anniversary of the discovery of the beautiful head of St. John the Baptist (May 25)".

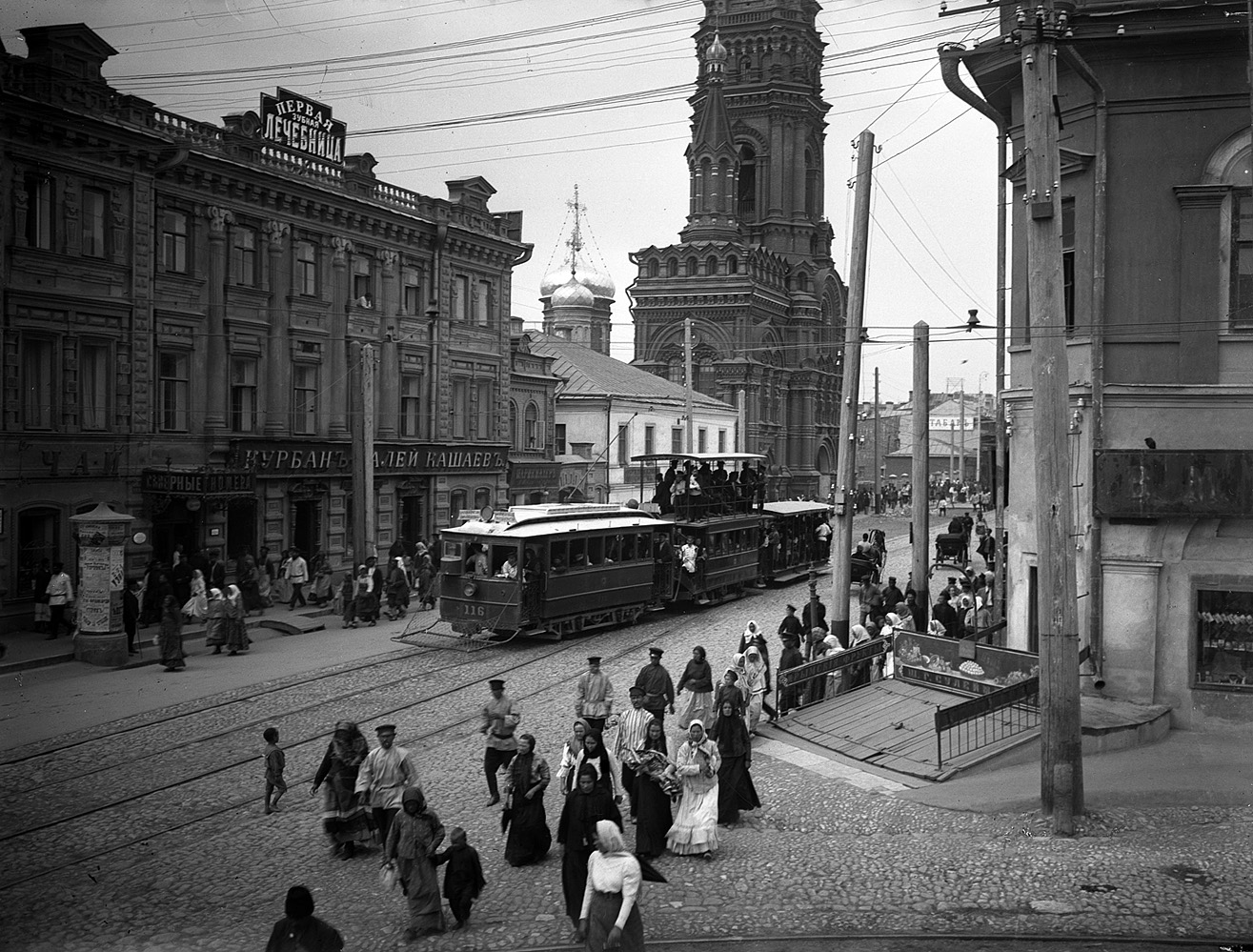
This is a view of Bolshaya Prolomnaya Street and the new bell tower of the Cathedral in the early 20th century.

In 1901, during a violent thunderstorm, the bell tower was struck by lightning. The newspaper of the time reported:

The bell tower was briefly illuminated by multicolored sparks. At the same time, the ceiling of the third level caught fire and the beams under the big bell went up in flames. A lightning strike caused a large hole in the wall, one and a half quarters deep and one arşın wide. Fragments of bricks and whole bricks filled the stairs and the floor of the second storey and broke two columns. Some brick fragments were even thrown into Prolomnaya Street.

The old tent-shaped bell tower was demolished in 1909 due to dilapidation.

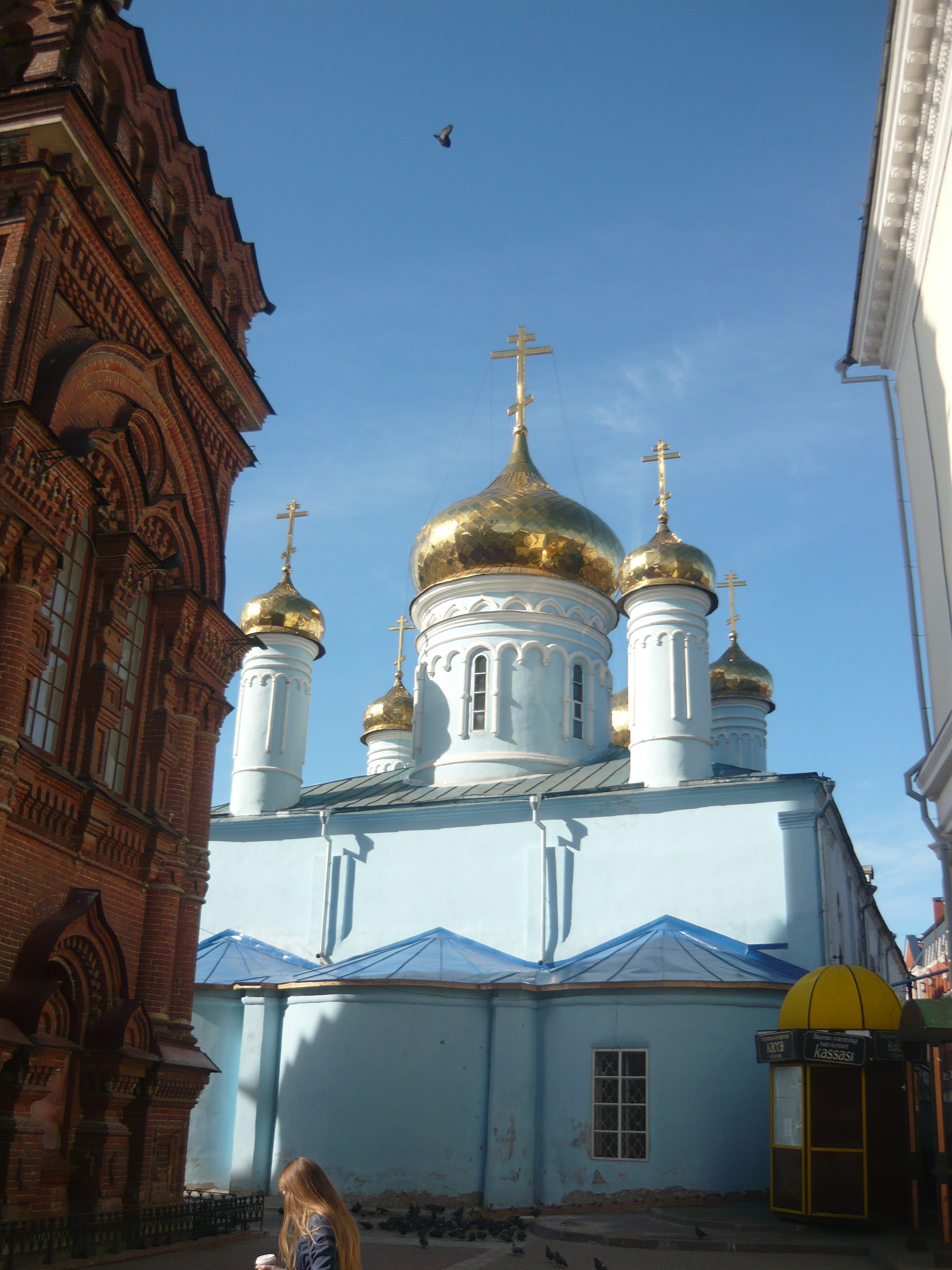
The Epiphany Cathedral.

So by 1917 the Epiphany Church complex included three churches. The main one: cold, two-domed in honor of the Epiphany of the Lord with the side chape of the Holy First Martyr and Archdeacon Stephen. The second one: warm, two-domed in honor of St. Andrew the Apostle with the side chapel of the Holy Martyrs of Prince Michael of Chernigov and his Boyar Fyodor; the third - cold, single-domed. And the third one: cold, single-domed, built in 1902 on the second level of the new bell tower in honor of the Third Epiphany. The Epiphany Church served as the city's cathedral during the Soviet period, from 1920 until it was closed in 1935.

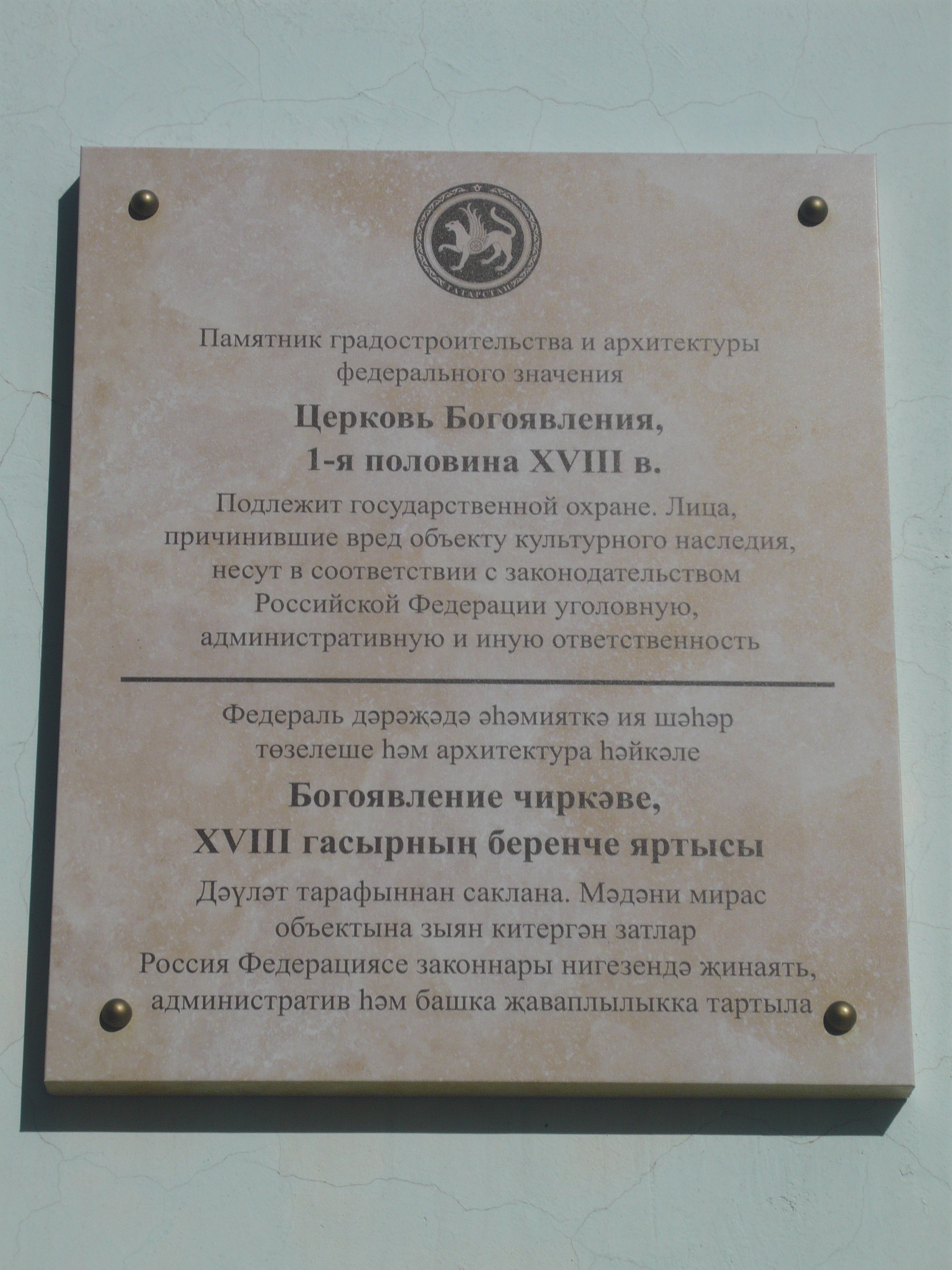
The sign of the Church of the Epiphany

The church of St. Andrew the First-Called was demolished in the 1930s. Later a five-storey residential building named after H. Yamashev and owned by the Kazan Fur Association was built in the place where in the 1950s the menagerie of the Kazan Zoo was located. After the church was closed, the main rooms of the church were used as a warehouse, and in the bell tower there were shops and an optician's shop.

The Church of the Three Kings was given to the sports hall of the Kazan Federal University in the 1950's. As a result, the decoration of the building was seriously damaged and the chapels were destroyed due to over-plastering.

The bell tower of the Epiphany Cathedral was declared an architectural monument of local importance in 1960.

It was repaired in 1973.

In 1995, the Epiphany Cathedral was included in the list of federal historical and cultural heritage of all-Russian significance as a monument of town planning and architecture.

The Epiphany Cathedral was returned to the Russian Orthodox Church in 1996-1997. Since then the church holds daily services.

The bell tower is under the jurisdiction of the Ministry of Culture of Tatarstan. It houses the Old Russian Art Exhibition Hall of the State Museum of Fine Arts of the Republic of Tatarstan. In 2001, the Chaliapin Chamber Hall was opened in the bell tower.

== Architecture ==
=== Cathedral ===
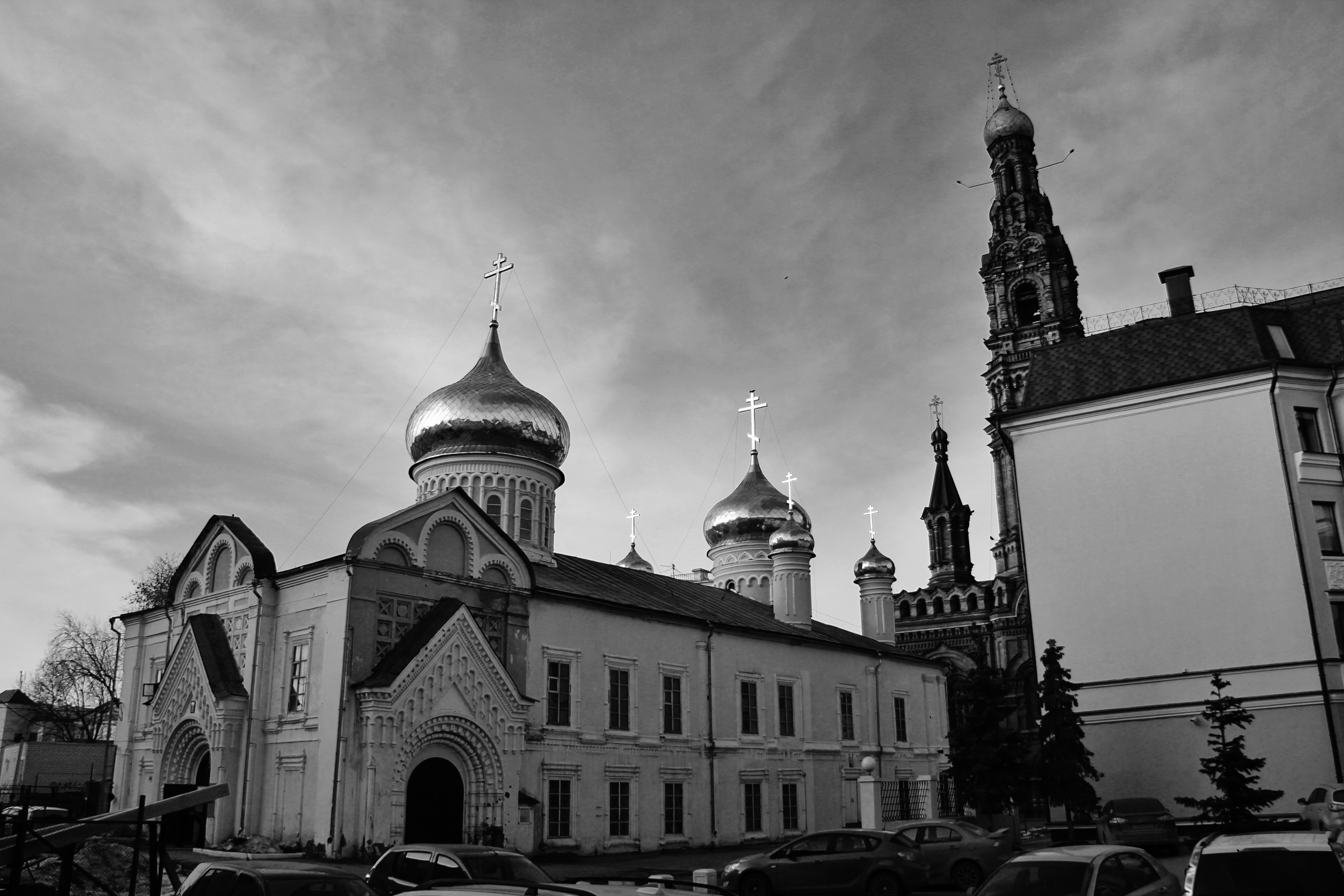
View of the cathedral courtyard and its bell tower.

The cathedral is at the back of the courtyard.

The temple was originally cube-shaped with five domes and three chapels with semicircular vaults. Later, a refectory with a chapter house was added to the main structure.

The Epiphany Church was highly decorated before the Revolution. The six tholobates and all three apses of the altar were surrounded by brick armour belts, which extended for tens of meters under the roof of the massive building. The outer walls are decorated with images of saints, while the domes are decorated with gold. The temple was once surrounded by a classical metal fence, complete with a gate and a chapel (which no longer exists).

The central tholobate was the only remaining part of the five chapters as in the mid-1990s. However, the domes have since been restored.

The interior does not contain any preserved antiquities. The iconostasis and the icons are modern.

The temple is not yet been fully restored.

=== Bell tower ===
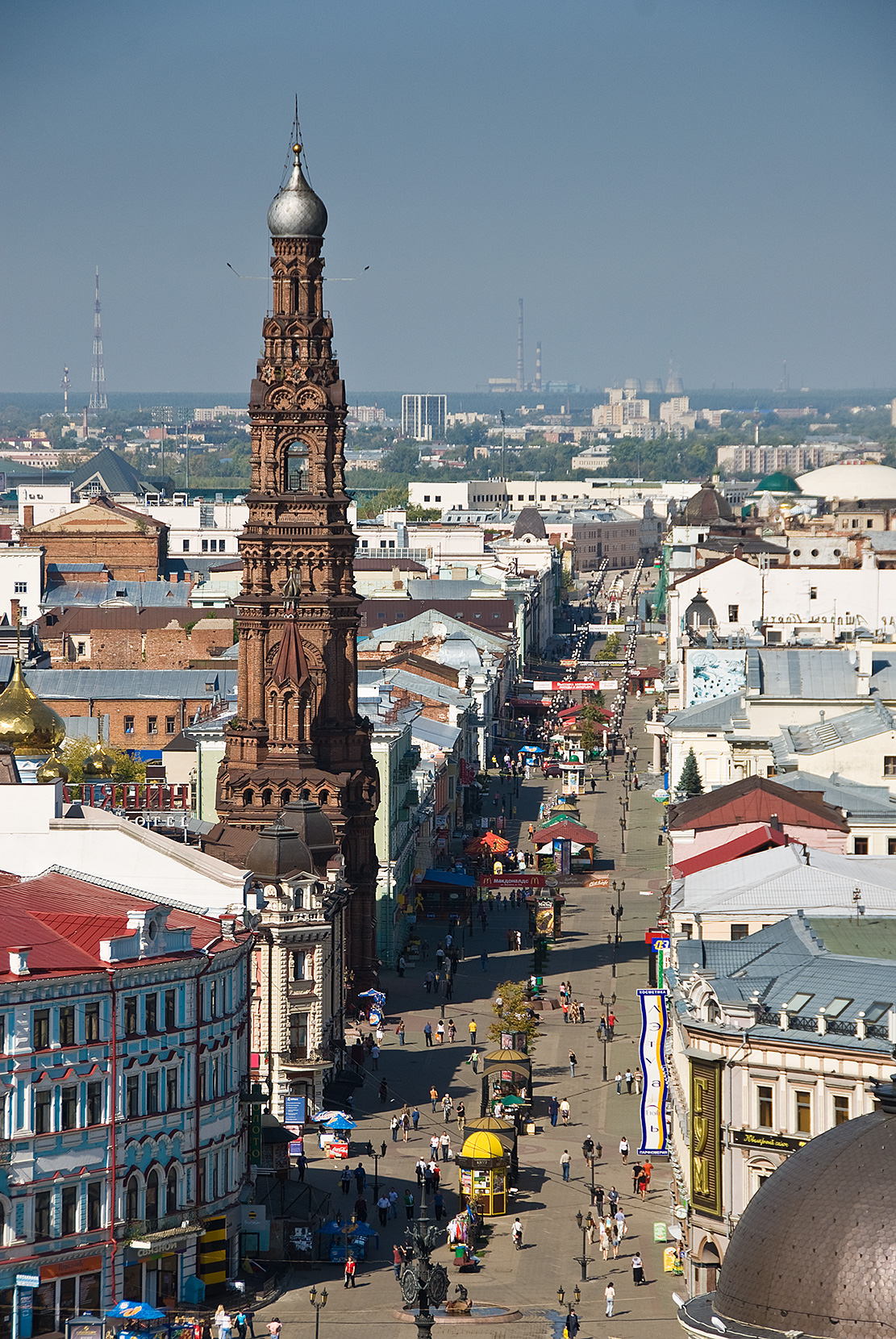
The bell tower of the Epiphany Cathedral is a prominent architectural attraction in the center of Kazan. For a long time it was the tallest building in the city.

The bell tower is a tall, tiered structure that stands out on the central street. It is between 62 and 74 meters high, depending on the source. It dominates the surrounding buildings and the historical environment of Kazan.

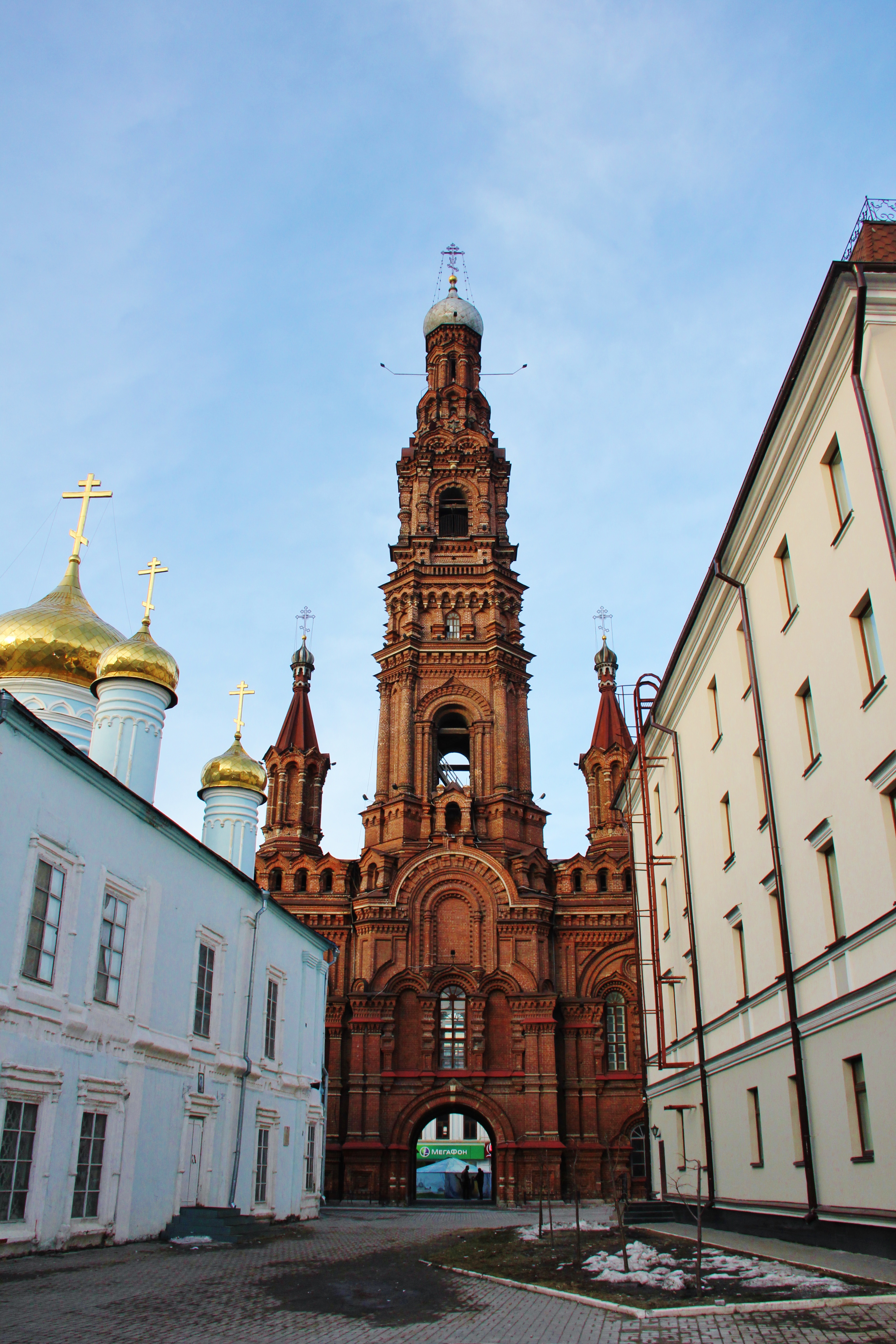
The bell tower seen from the cathedral entrance.

However, the new bell tower of the Epiphany Church was not only built for its intended purpose. On the first floor there is a small room known as the "conversation room" for the Old Believers, as well as a church store. On the second floor there is the church in honor of the discovery of the venerable head of St. John the Baptist.

The two-storey square was laid out in a rectangular shape along the street, with two-storey wing volumes topped with faceted turrets over hipped roofs and petal chapels. Turrets with five crosses (partially lost) were located above the eastern and western risaliths of the quatrefoil.

Originally, the design included a passage from the street to the Epiphany Church through the first level, which was built during the Soviet period and opened in the 1990s. The temple volume was located above the first level, and a grand staircase in the northern wing led to it.

The bell tower has an eight-sided plasticized octagonal column with two tiers of bells. Large arches cut through the column and it is completed with a tinned steel chapter on a faceted tholobate.

The decorative style of the building is a skillful combination of ordinary and shaped red brick with white stone composition. It is based on a pictorial combination of modernized Old Russian patterns with geometric forms from the turn of the 19th and 20th centuries. The design features arched openings with keel-shaped cornices, kokoshniki corbel-like decorations and semi-columns with overlapping on the ribs of octagonal, repeated in different versions of the blind arcade.

=== Other interesting facts ===
- In 1854-1862, Archpriest Mikhail Zefirov, a theology professor who later moved to the Imperial Kazan University, served as the church's priest. From 1862 to 1886, he was followed by Evfimiy Alexandrovich Malov, a renowned ethnographer and missionary. Malov was the author of the two-volume work "Historical Description of Kazan Churches" and a linguist who actively participated in the publication of the Quran with a parallel Russian translation.
- On February 2, 1873 Fyodor Ivanovich Chaliapin was baptized in the Epiphany Church, according to the metrical book. He was born on February 1. Later Chaliapin sang in the church choir. In 1998 a monument to him was erected near the cathedral. The hotel located in the restored building of the former Sovet Hotel is named after Chaliapin, called "Chaliapin Palace Hotel".

== Bibliography ==
- Худяков М. Г. (1920). К истории казанского зодчества. Vol. 5–6 (Казанский музейный вестник ed.). p. 29.
- Дульский, П. М. (1942). Казань XVI—XVIII столетий. p. 11.
- "Истоки былого". Вечерняя Казань. 1982-09-27.
- Республика Татарстан: Православные памятники (середина XVI — начало XX веков). Kazan: Фест. 1998.
