= CPM =

CPM may refer to:

== Advertising ==
- Cost per mille, the advertising cost per thousand views
- Cost per thousand impressions, the online advertising equivalent

== Entertainment and media ==
- Central Park Media, an American entertainment company
- Challenge ProMode Arena, a modification to the game Quake III Arena
- Chicago Public Media, a National Public Radio member organization

== Health and medicine ==
- Carboxypeptidase M
- Cellular Potts model, a computer simulation of cellular structures
- Central pontine myelinolysis
- Certified Professional Midwife
- Chinese patent medicine
- Chlorphenamine, an antihistamine drug
- Confined placental mosaicism
- Continuous passive motion, a physical therapy technique
- Cyclopropylmescaline, a psychedelic drug

== Management ==
- Certified practising marketer, a qualification for Australian marketers
- Certified Property Manager
- Certified Public Manager
- Corporate performance management
- Critical path method, an algorithm for scheduling project activities
- Comparable profits method, a transfer pricing method

== Politics ==
- Christian Political Movement, a South African political party
- Clement Payne Movement, a Barbadian political party
- Coalition for Melilla (Spanish: Coalición por Melilla), a political party in Melilla, Spain
- Communist Party of India (Marxist)
- Communist Party of Malaya, the Malayan Communist Party
- Party of Communists of the Republic of Moldova

== Religion ==
- Chosen People Ministries, a Messianic Jewish evangelical organization
- Church planting movement
- Fathers of Mercy (Latin: Congregatio Presbyterorum a Misericordia), a Catholic order in France
- The Pentecostal Mission, formerly the Ceylon Pentecostal Mission, Sri Lanka

== Science and mathematics ==
- Clique percolation method, a clustering algorithm for networks
- Counts per minute, a unit of radioactivity
- Cucurbit powdery mildew, a fungal infection of melons and cucumbers

== Technology ==
- CP/M, an early microcomputer operating system
- Characters per minute
- Communications Processor Module, a networking engine in Motorola/Freescale QUICC processors
- Compressed pattern matching
- Continuous phase modulation
- C_{pm}, a process capability index
- Crucible Particle Metallurgy, a steel-making process developed by Crucible Industries

== Other uses ==
- Chicago Parking Meters
- Colonial Police Medal
- Communication privacy management theory, a theory of privacy in interpersonal communication
- Compton/Woodley Airport in Los Angeles County, California
- Content Planning Module, a component of the U.S. Navy's Authoring Instructional Materials
- Office of the Prime Minister (Canada) (French: Cabinet du Premier ministre)
