= Certified practising marketer =

Certified Practising Marketer, or CPM, is a qualification for Australian marketers. The certification is administered by the Australian Marketing Institute.

== Certification criteria ==
Assessments are made using quantitative and qualitative factors, including formal education, career achievements, employment history, and significant post-graduate courses.

CPM applicants must have a minimum of 5 years of marketing experience, 10 years of management experience in the marketing field or a related degree, and a commerce or business degree with a marketing major. Evidence of ongoing education and learnings (such as AMI courses or significant post graduate courses) are also taken into account.

== CPM of the Year ==
Each year, the Australian Marketing Institute hosts the Awards for Marketing Excellence, where the nation's best performing CPM receives the Certified Practising Marketer of the Year award.
