= Feodor Chaliapin =

Russian opera singer (1873–1938)

- Фёдор Шаляпин
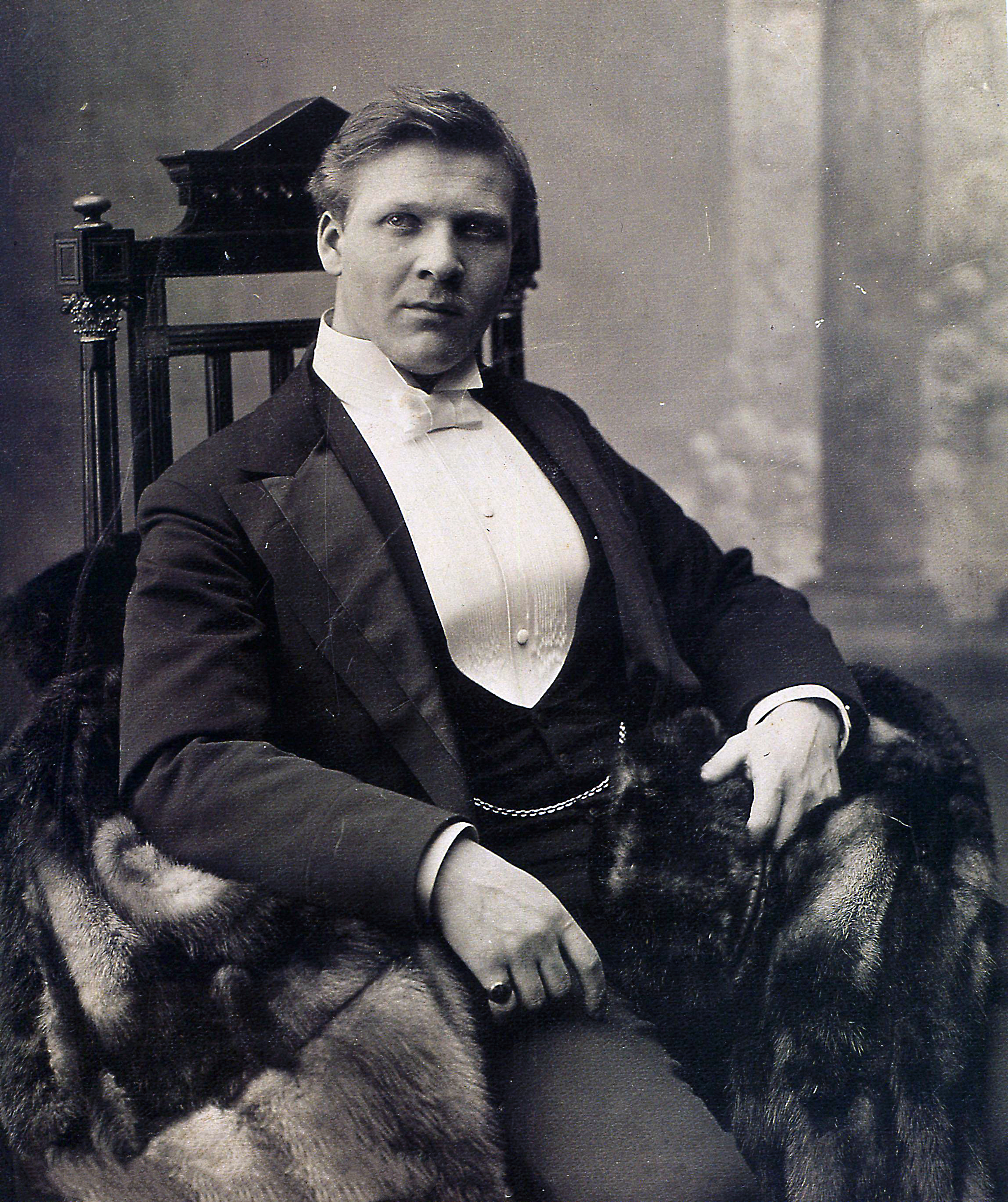
- Chaliapin in 1896
- Born: Fyodor Ivanovich Shalyapin; 13 February [O.S. 1 February] 1873; Kazan, Russia
- Died: 12 April 1938 (aged 65); Paris, France
- Occupation: Opera singer
- Years active: 1894–1938
- Spouses: Iola Tornaghi (m. 1898); Marina Petsold (m. 1927)
- Children: 9, including Boris and Feodor

Feodor Ivanovich Chaliapin (Note: Chaliapin's first name is also cited as Fyodor and his surname as Shalyapin. Chaliapin francized his surname as Chaliapine, and his name appeared on early His Master's Voice 78s as Theodore Chaliapine.) (Russian: Фёдор Ива́нович Шаля́пин, romanized: Fyodor Ivanovich Shalyapin, IPA: [ˈfʲɵdər ɨˈvanəvʲɪtɕ ʂɐˈlʲapʲɪn]; 13 February [O.S. 1 February] 1873 – 12 April 1938) was a Russian opera singer. Possessing a deep and expressive bass voice, he enjoyed an important international career at major opera houses and is often credited with establishing the tradition of naturalistic acting in his chosen art form.

== Early life ==
Chaliapin was born Fyodor Ivanovich Shalyapin on 1 February (O.S.) 1873 into a peasant family in Kazan, Russia, in the wing of Lisitsyn–Emelin house on 10 Rybnoryadskaya Street (now Pushkin Street). This wing no longer exists, but the house with the yard where the wing was situated is still there. The next day, Candlemas (The Meeting of Our Lord), he was baptized at Epiphany Cathedral (Bogoyavlenskaya) on Bolshaya Prolomnaya street (now Bauman Street). His godparents were his neighbors: the shoemaker Nikolay Tonkov and Ludmila Kharitonova, a 12-year-old girl. The dwelling was expensive for his father, Ivan Yakovlevich, who served as a clerk in the Zemskaya Uprava (Zemstvo District Council), and in 1878, the Chaliapin family moved to the village of Ametyevo (also Ometyevo, or the Ometyev settlements, now a settlement within Kazan) behind the area of Sukonnaya Sloboda, and settled in a small house.

== Early career ==
His vocal teacher was Dmitri Usatov. Chaliapin began his career in Tbilisi and at the Imperial Opera in Saint Petersburg in 1894. He was then invited to sing at the Mamontov Private Opera (1896–1899); he first appeared there as Mephistopheles in Charles Gounod's Faust, a role in which he achieved considerable success.

"Le veau d'or"
Mephisto in Gounod's Faust

Monologue of Boris Godunov
From Mussorgsky's Boris Godunov

"Ej, ukhnem!"
1902 recording of "The Song of the Volga Boatmen"

"Volga, Volga mat' rodnaya"
Russian folksong later adapted as "The Carnival is Over"

At the Mamontov, Chaliapin met Sergei Rachmaninoff, who was serving as an assistant conductor there and with whom he remained friends for life. Rachmaninoff taught him much about musicianship, including how to analyze a music score, and insisted that Chaliapin learn not only his own roles but also all the other roles in the operas in which he was scheduled to appear. With Rachmaninoff, he learned the title role of Modest Mussorgsky's Boris Godunov, which became his signature character. Chaliapin returned the favor by showing Rachmaninoff how he built each of his interpretations around a culminating moment or "point". Regardless of where that point was or at which dynamic within that piece, the performer had to know how to approach it with absolute calculation and precision; otherwise, the whole construction of the piece could crumble and the piece could become disjointed. Rachmaninoff put this approach to considerable use when he became a full-time concert pianist after World War I.

On the strength of his Mamontov appearances, the Bolshoi Theatre in Moscow engaged Chaliapin, and he appeared there regularly from 1899 until 1914. During the First World War, Chaliapin also appeared regularly at the Zimin Private Opera in Moscow. In addition, from 1901, Chaliapin began touring in the West, making a sensational debut at Italy's La Scala that year as the devil in a production of Arrigo Boito's Mefistofele, under the baton of one of the 20th century's most dynamic opera conductors, Arturo Toscanini. At the end of his career, Toscanini observed that the Russian bass was the greatest operatic talent with whom he had ever worked. The singer's Metropolitan Opera debut in the 1907 season was disappointing due to the unprecedented frankness of his stage acting; but he returned to the Met in 1921 and sang there with immense success for eight seasons, New York's audiences having grown more broad-minded since 1907. In 1913, Chaliapin was introduced to London and Paris by the entrepreneur Sergei Diaghilev (1872–1929), at which point he began giving well-received solo recitals in which he sang traditional Russian folk songs as well as more serious fare. Such folk songs included "Vdol po Piterskoy" (translated as "Along Peterskaya", which he recorded with a British-based Russian folk-instrument orchestra) and the song which he made famous throughout the world: "The Song of the Volga Boatmen". In 1925, when he performed in New York, his piano accompanist was a young Harry Lubin, later to become a composer of music for the television series The Outer Limits.

== Later life ==
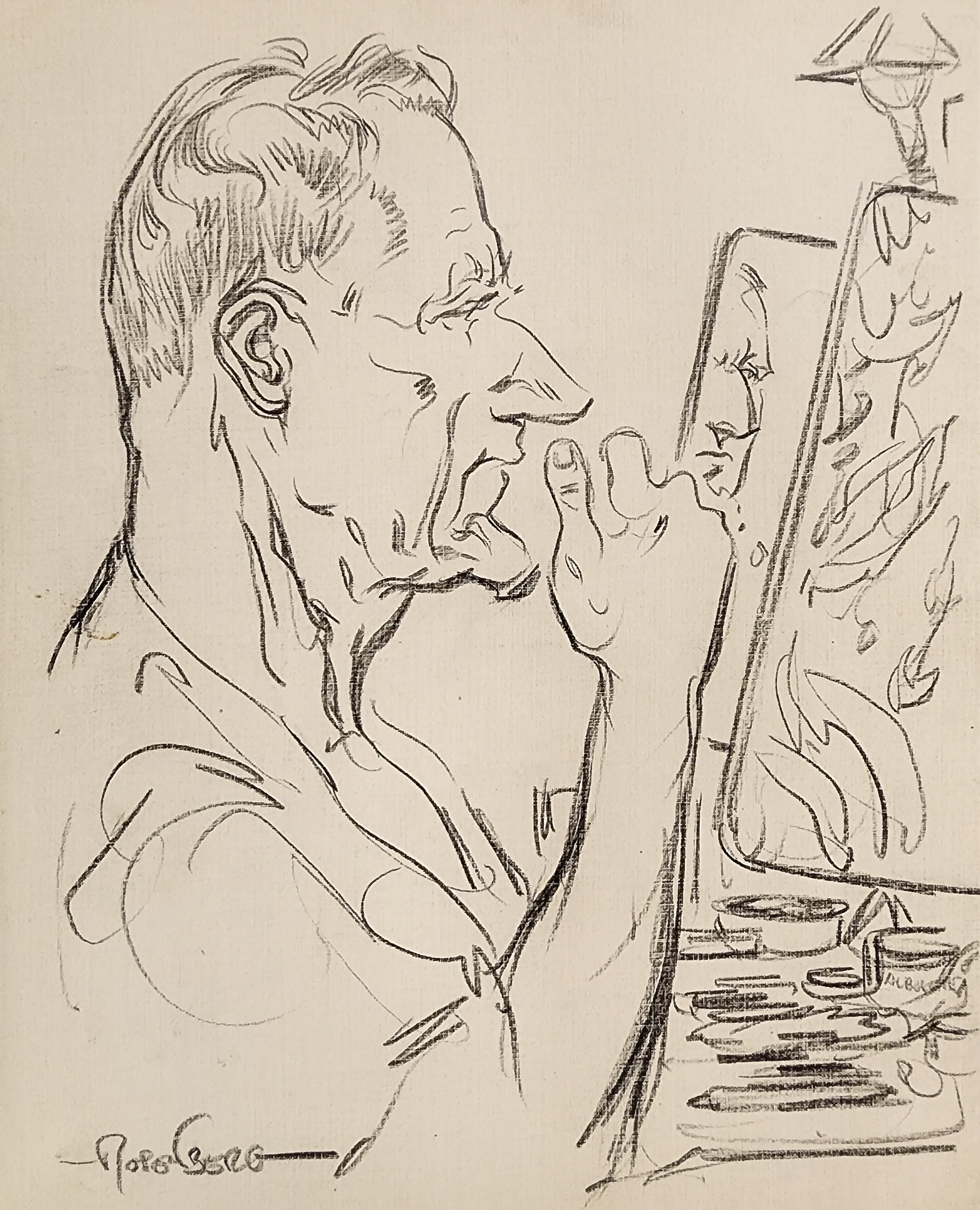
Feodor Chaliapin in his dressing room, drawing by Manuel Rosenberg 1924

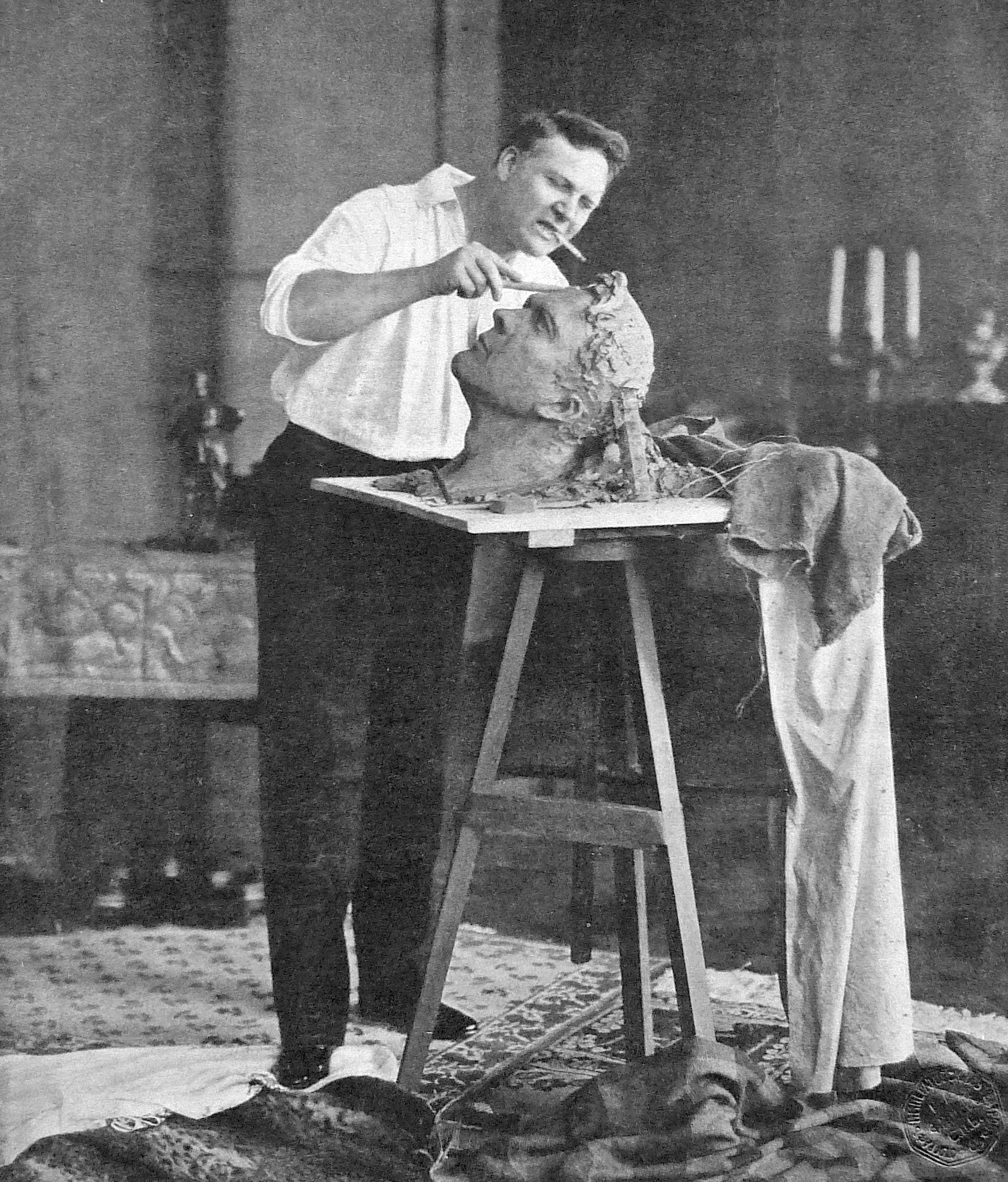
Chaliapin creating his self-portrait in 1912

Chaliapin toured Australia in 1926, giving a series of recitals which were highly acclaimed. Privately, Chaliapin's personal affairs were in a state of disarray as a consequence of the Russian Revolution of 1917. At first he was treated as a revered artist of the newly emerged Soviet Russia. However, the harsh realities of everyday life under the new regime, and the unstable climate which followed because of the ensuing Civil War, combined with, reportedly, the encroachment on some of his property by the Communist authorities, caused him to remain perpetually outside Russia after 1921. Chaliapin initially moved to Finland and later lived in France. Cosmopolitan Paris, with its significant Russian émigré population, became his base, and ultimately, the city of his death. He was renowned for his larger-than-life carousing during this period, but he never sacrificed his dedication to his art.

Chaliapin's attachment to Paris did not prevent him from pursuing an international operatic and concert career in England, the United States, and further afield. In May 1931 he appeared in the Russian Season directed by Sir Thomas Beecham at London's Lyceum Theatre. His most famous part was the title role of Boris Godunov (excerpts of which he recorded 1929–31 and earlier). He is remembered also for his interpretations of Ivan the Terrible in Rimsky-Korsakov's The Maid of Pskov and Salieri in Mozart and Salieri, Mephistopheles in Gounod's Faust, Don Quixote in Massenet's Don Quichotte, and King Philip in Verdi's Don Carlos.

Largely owing to his advocacy, Russian operas such as Mussorgsky's Boris Godunov and Khovanshchina, Glinka's Ivan Susanin, Borodin's Prince Igor and Rimsky-Korsakov's The Tsar's Bride and Sadko, became well known in the West.

Chaliapin made one sound film for the director G. W. Pabst, the 1933 Don Quixote. The film was made in three different versions – French, English, and German, as was sometimes the prevailing custom. Chaliapin starred in all three versions, each of which used the same script, sets, and costumes, but different supporting casts. The English and the French versions are the most often seen, and both were released in May 2006 on a DVD. Pabst's film was not a version of the Massenet opera but a dramatic adaptation of Miguel de Cervantes' novel, with music and songs by Jacques Ibert.

In 1932, Chaliapin published a memoir, Man and Mask: Forty Years in the Life of a Singer. While touring Japan in 1936 he was suffering from a toothache, and a hotel chef devised a way to cook a steak to be extra tender for him. This dish is known in Japan as a Chaliapin steak to this day.

Chaliapin's last stage performance took place at the Monte Carlo Opera in 1937, as Boris Godunov. Chaliapin lived in Paris, at 22 Avenue d'Eylau, where he died of leukemia. Buried in Paris, Chaliapin rested in the Batignolles cemetery until 1984, when his remains were transferred to the Novodevichy cemetery in Moscow.

He owned a beautiful villa on the Sainte-Barbe hill in Saint-Jean-de-Luz, overlooking the Bay of Biscay.

== Personal life ==
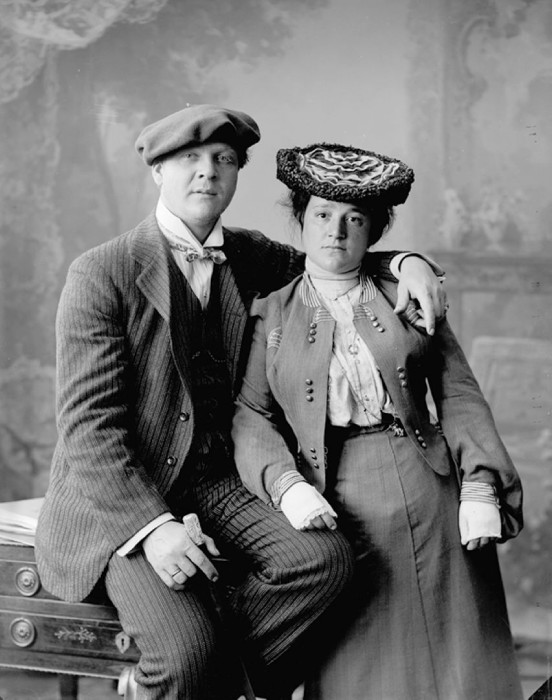
Chaliapin and Tornaghi, c. 1890–1900

Chaliapin was married twice. He met his first wife, Italian ballerina Iola Tornaghi (1873–1965), in Nizhny Novgorod. They married in Russia in 1898 and had six children: Igor, Boris (1904–1979), Irina, Lidia, and twins Feodor Jr. (1905–1992) and Taniya. Igor died aged four. Feodor Jr. was a character actor featured in Western motion pictures including Moonstruck and The Name of the Rose opposite Sean Connery. Boris was a well-known graphical artist, who painted the portraits used on 414 covers of Time magazine between 1942 and 1970.

While married to Tornaghi, Chaliapin lived with Marina Petsold (1882–1964), a widow who already had two children from her first marriage. She had three daughters with Chaliapin: Marfa (1910–2003), Marina (1912–2009), and Dasya (1921–1977). Chaliapin's two families lived separately, one in Moscow and the other in Saint Petersburg, and did not interact. Chaliapin married Petsold in 1927 in Paris.

Chaliapin had his portrait painted a number of times by the Russian artist Konstantin Korovin. They had been introduced to each other in 1896 and became close friends.

== Gallery ==
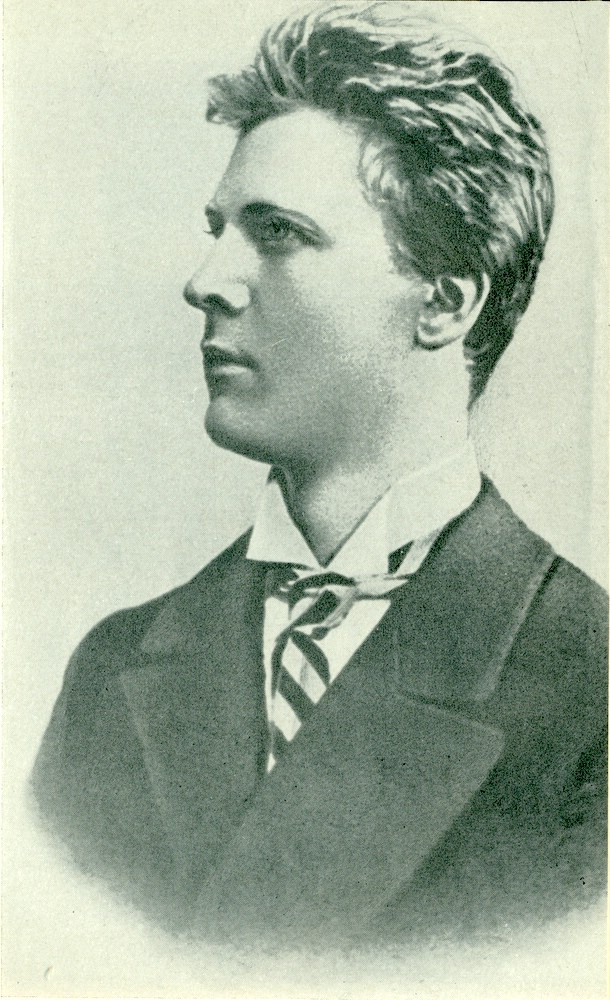
Feodor Chaliapin in 1893

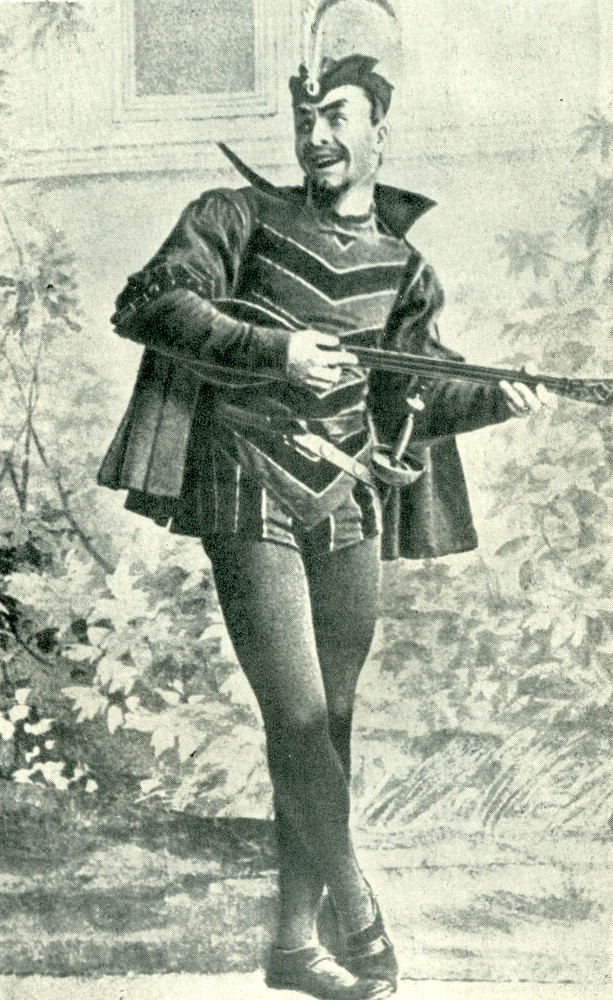
Feodor Chaliapin as Mefistofele in 1895

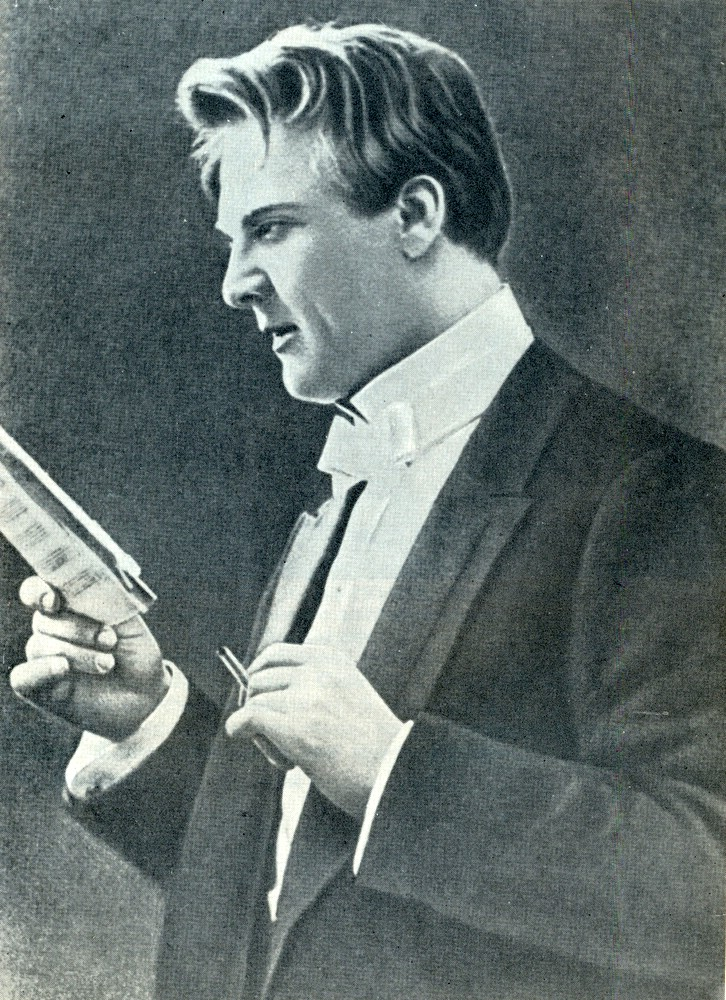
Feodor Chaliapin in 1900

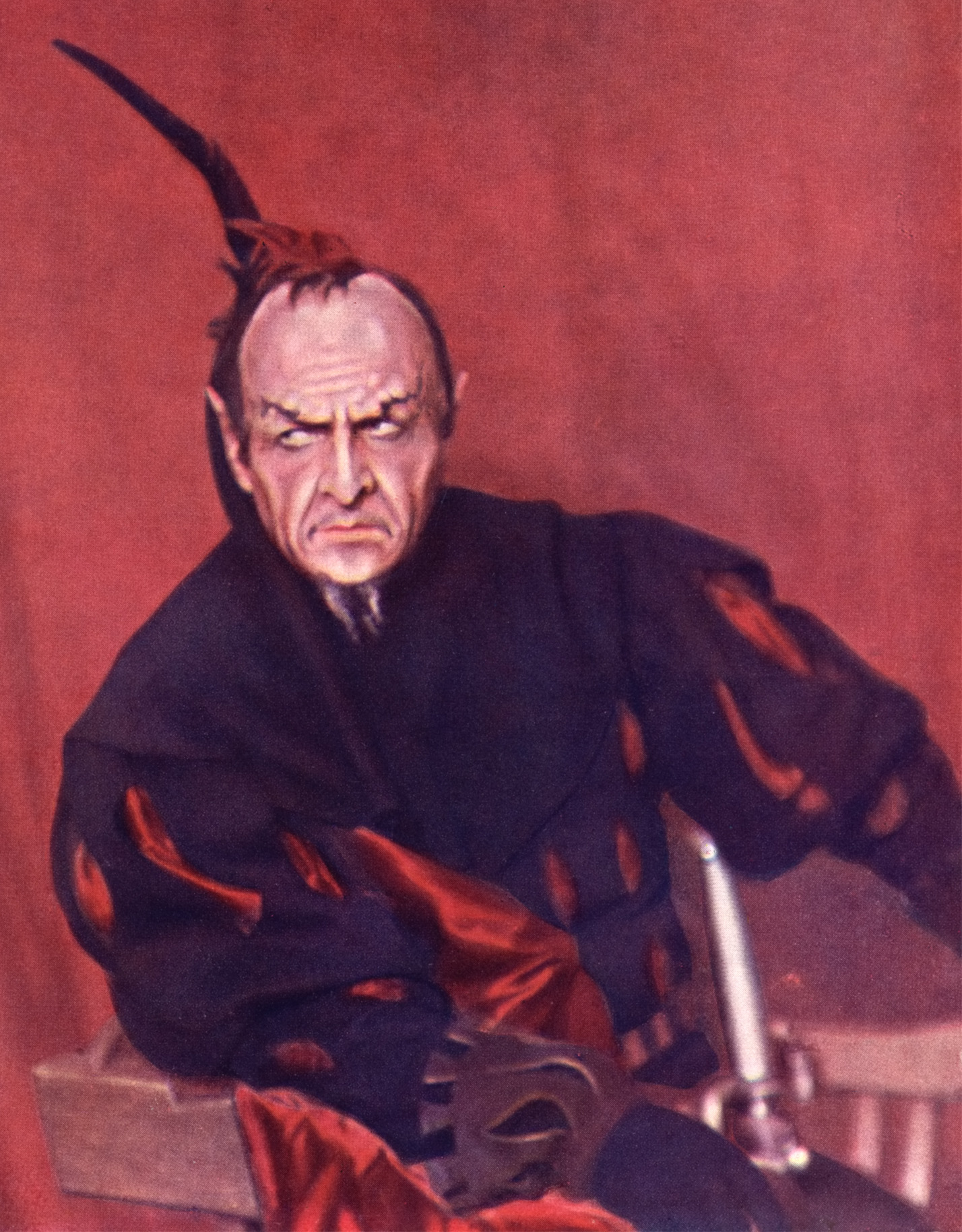
Chaliapin as Mephisto; photograph by Sergey Prokudin-Gorsky, 1915

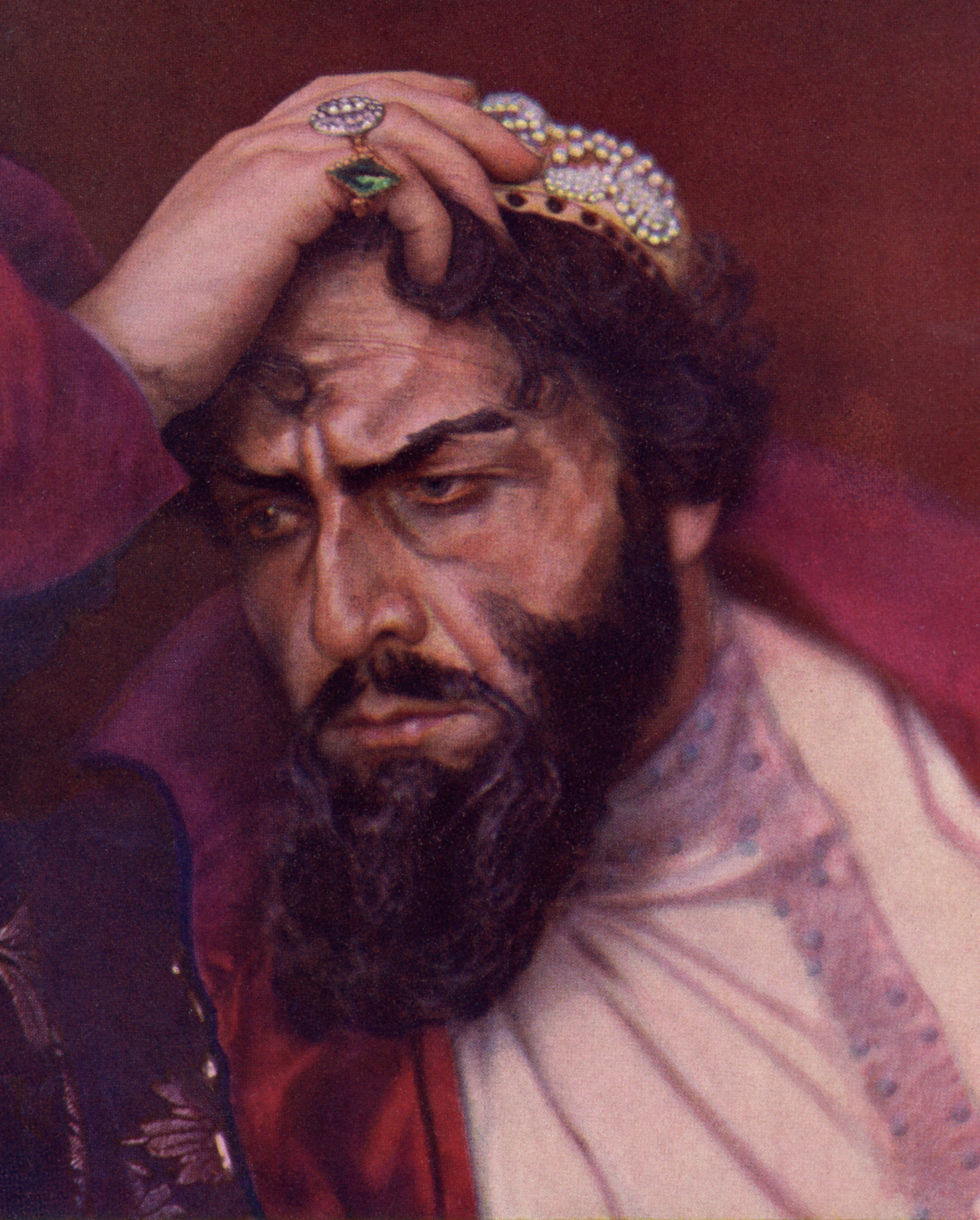
Chaliapin as Boris Godunov, 1915

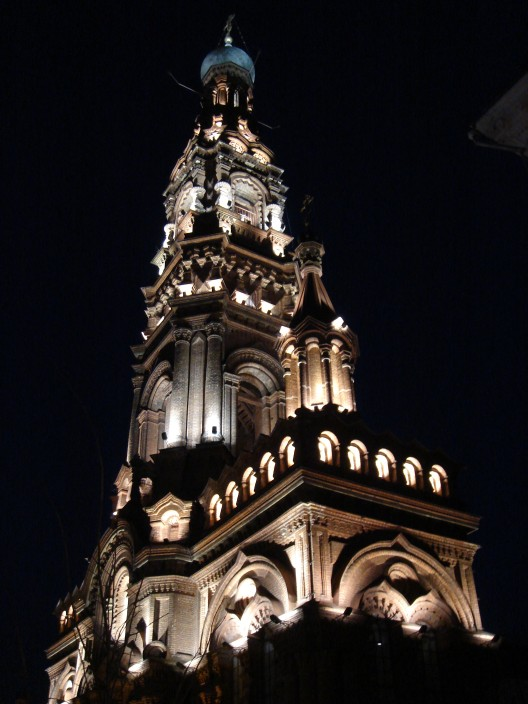
The belltower of the Epiphany Cathedral (Bogoyavlenskaya) in Kazan. The Chaliapin Chamber Hall is located on the second floor of the belltower.

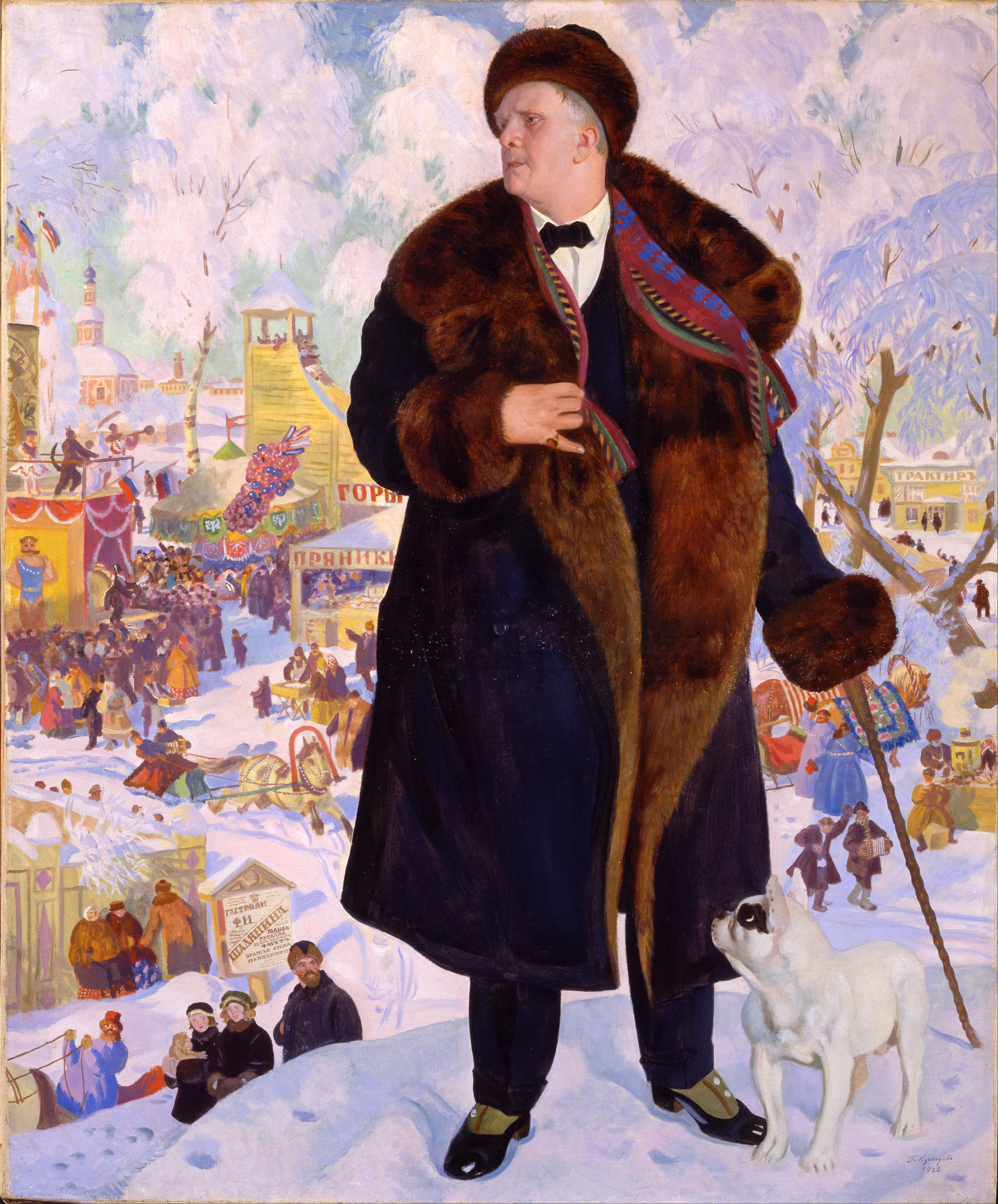
Portrait of Chapliapin by Boris Kustodiev, 1921

Feodor Chaliapin and his daughters in 1924.

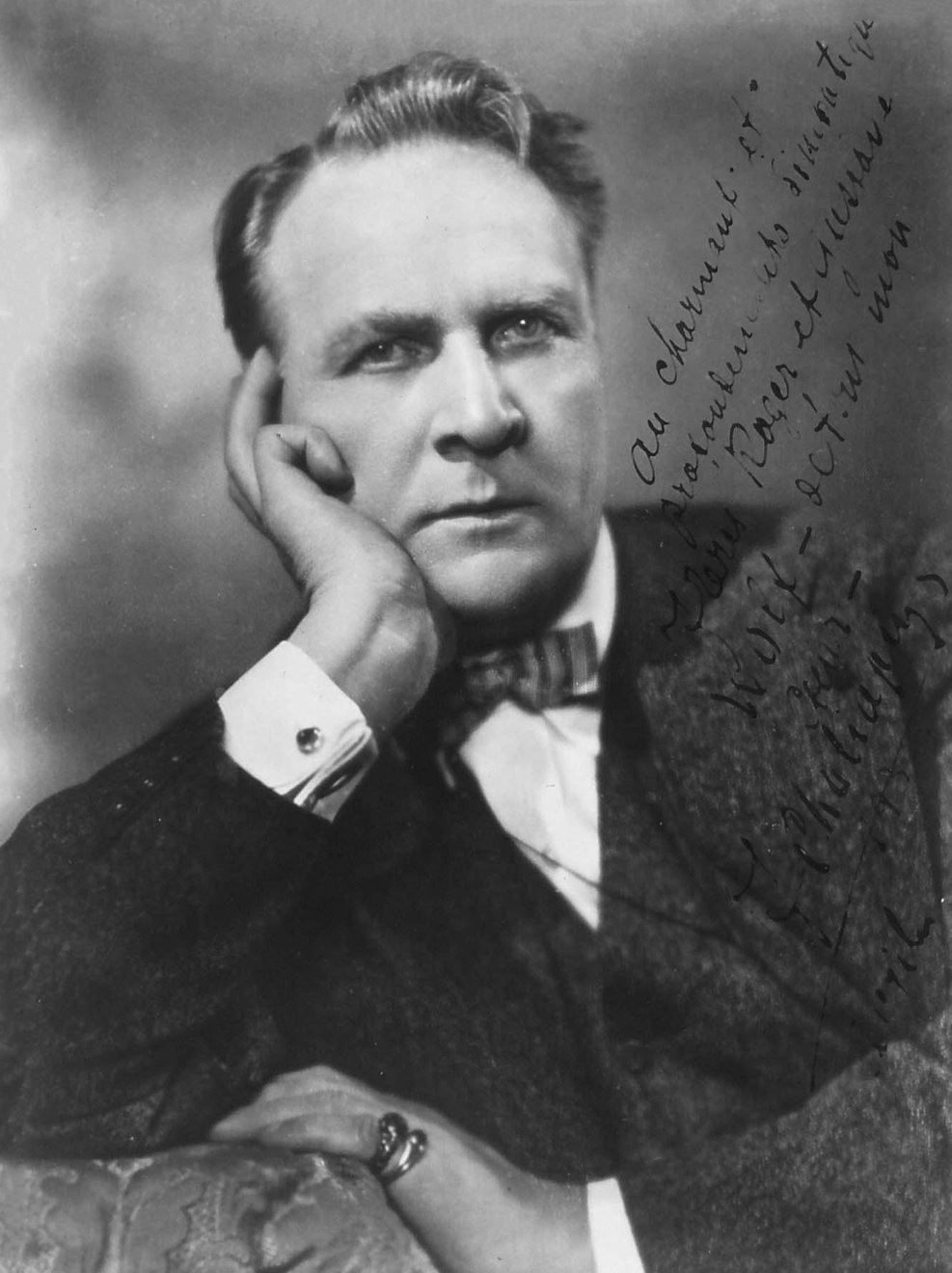
Feodor Chaliapin signed photograph. c. 1930

Feodor Chaliapin in 1938.

== Honours and awards ==
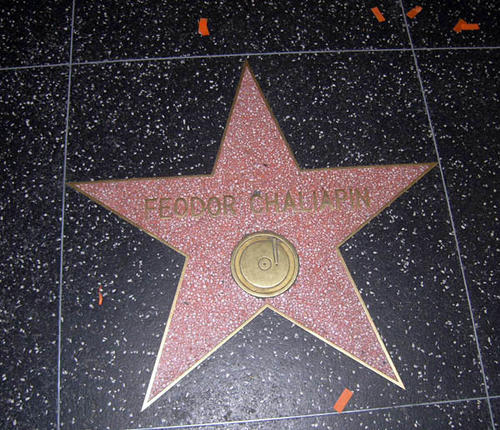
Chaliapin's star on the Hollywood Walk of Fame

- 1902 – Order of the Golden Star of Bukhara, 3rd class
- 1907 – Golden Cross of the Prussian eagle
- 1908 – Commander of the officer's rank
- 1910 – Soloist of His Majesty (Russia)
- 1912 – Soloist of His Majesty the King of Italy
- 1914 – British award for special achievements in the arts
- 1914 – Order of St. Stanislaus, 3rd class (Russia)
- 1916 – The title of the officer
- 1918 – People's Artist of the Republic (The Soviet government withdrew the title in 1927)
- 1934 – Commander of the Legion of Honour (France)
- 1935 -Elected to Royal Academy of Music, awarded diploma of academician (with Arturo Toscanini)
- 1984 - Feodor Chaliapin received a star on the Hollywood Walk of Fame
- 1991 - People's Artist of the R.F. Republic (title returned to Feodor Chaliapin by Russian Federation)

== Autobiographical works ==
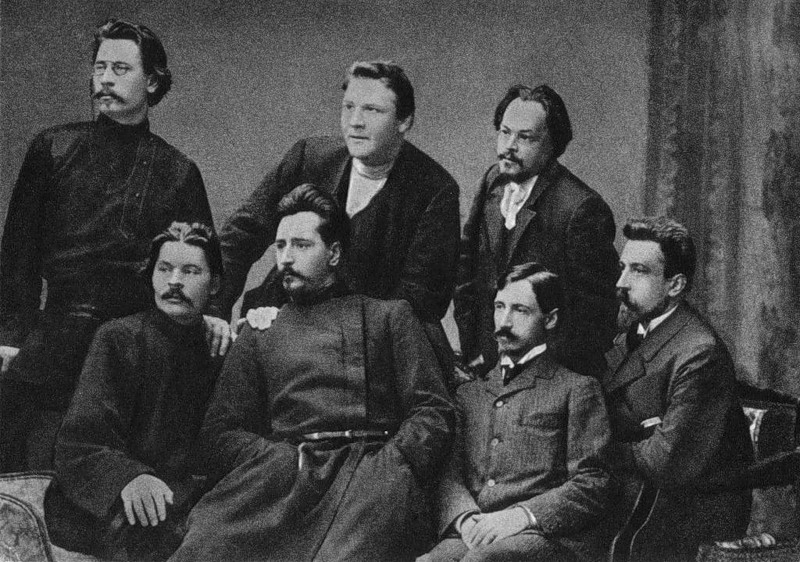
Chaliapin (center) with fellow members of the Moscow Sreda in 1902

Chaliapin's autobiographical collaboration with Maxim Gorky occurred in 1917. He had already begun writing his autobiography long before, in the Crimea. In 1917, while he was in the south of France, he was urged to write such a work by a French journalist who hoped to ghost-write it. Gorky, who was his intimate friend and was then living in Capri, persuaded Chaliapin to stay with him there and with the help of a secretary a great deal of information was taken down which Gorky fashioned into a long manuscript, published in Russia in 1917 as a series of articles in the journal Letopis. Meanwhile, Chaliapin attempted to sell it to an American publisher, who refused it on learning that it had been published in Russian. There was a rift with Gorky, and Chaliapin worked with another editor to produce a 'new' version of his original text. The new book, published in America as Pages of My Life (Harper and Brothers, New York 1927), took the story only up to 1905, and lacked the depth, style and life of Gorky's version. Then, in 1932, Chaliapin published Man and Mask (Alfred A. Knopf, New York) to celebrate the fortieth anniversary of his first stage appearance. The original manuscript of the Gorky version was first translated and published in English in 1967, by Nina Froud and James Hanley, as Chaliapin: An autobiography as told to Maxim Gorky (Stein and Day, New York), and included an appendix of original correspondence including a section relating to Gorky.

== Recordings ==
Chaliapin possessed a high-lying bass voice with an unmistakable timbre which recorded clearly. He cut a prolific number of discs for the Gramophone Company, beginning in Russia with acoustical recordings made at the dawn of the 20th Century, and continuing through the early electrical (microphone) era. Some of his performances at the Royal Opera House, Covent Garden, in London were recorded live in the 1920s, including a haunting version of the "Death of Boris" from Boris Godunov. His last disc, made in Tokyo in 1936, was of the famous The Song of the Volga Boatmen. Many of his recordings were issued in the United States by RCA Victor. His legacy of recordings is available on CDs issued by EMI, Preiser, Naxos and other commercial labels. In 2018 his complete recordings were issued on 13 CDs by Marston Records. They consist of songs as well as a range of arias from Italian, French and, Russian opera.

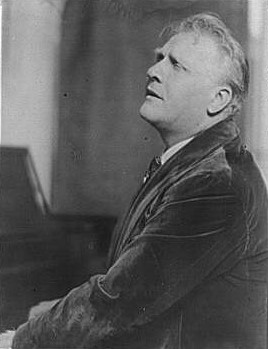
Portrait photograph of Fyodor Chaliapin, 1922

== Opinions on his art ==
- Opera commentator/historian Michael Scott avers that: "Chaliapin ranks with Caruso and Maria Callas as one of the three greatest singers and most potent and influential artists of the twentieth century."
- "At the Met he sang the role of Basilio in Rossini's The Barber of Seville as a vulgar, unctuous, greasy priest, constantly picking his nose and wiping his fingers onto his cassock. Audiences were appalled. Defending himself, Chaliapin said in an interview that Basilio 'is a Spanish priest. It is a type I know well. He is not the modern American priest, clean and well-groomed; he is dirty and unkempt, he is a beast, and this is what I make him, a comic beast.' " (Harold C. Schonberg)
- Some accused Chaliapin of brawling backstage. Rachmaninoff agreed. "Feodor is a brawler. They are all scared of his very spirit. He shouts suddenly or even hits someone! And Feodor's fist is powerful ... He can take care of himself. And how else should one behave? Backstage at our own theater it's just like a saloon. They shout, they drink, they swear in the foulest language." In a letter from November 1910 to the editor of Utro Rossii, the publication which supposedly quoted the above remarks and which attributes them to Rachmaninoff, the composer categorically denies the quotation and wrote "The article publishes without my knowledge words of mine about the Bolshoi Theater and Chaliapin...I said that we often have regrettable confusion backstage at the Bolshoi Theater...I also said that I had heard rumors that since Chaliapin had been appointed régisseur of those operas in which he sings, there is more quiet backstage. That is all I said... S. Rachmaninoff".
- Met diva Geraldine Farrar said Chaliapin had a voice like "melodious thunder" but warned of his unannounced antics to hog the limelight onstage. "Chaliapin was a wonderful opera partner, but one had to be watchful for sudden departures from the rehearsal plan, and the touches of originality favorable only for the aggrandizement of Chaliapin."
- Dale Carnegie, referencing a story by impresario Sol Hurok, says that Chaliapin was often temperamental, even acting like a “spoiled child.” On hearing the concert basso's complaint that his throat was raw and that he would not be able to sing at a scheduled performance at the Metropolitan Opera, Hurok agreed immediately to cancel the engagement, commenting: “It will only cost you a couple of thousand dollars, but that is nothing in comparison to your reputation.” Chaliapin left open the possibility that he might nevertheless perform if he felt better later, and Hurok dutifully checked on him twice before the concert time. Finally he agreed to perform, provided that Hurok would announce to the audience that Chaliapin “had a very bad cold and was not in good voice.” Carnegie comments approvingly: “Mr. Hurok would lie and say he would do it, for he knew that was the only way to get the basso out on the stage.”
