= Australian Marketing Institute =

Australian professional body for marketers

The Australian Marketing Institute (AMI) is Australia's largest professional body for marketers. The AMI's core purpose is to support progress in the careers of their members and advance the marketing profession. The AMI has over 30,000 marketers in its network and is certification body for the Certified Practising Marketer designation in Australia.

== History ==
Founded in 1933 as the Institute of Sales and Business Management, in 1965 the name was changed to Institute of Sales and Marketing Executives, and in 1975 to its current name, Australian Marketing Institute.

== Structure ==
AMI operates under the direction of a National Board of Directors and the help of volunteer councilors known as the State Committees.

=== Current National Board of Directors ===
- Chair: Lynda Cavalera
- Deputy Chair: Andrew Thornton
- Company Secretary: Narendra Prasad
- Director: Nick Kariotoglou
- Director: Nicholas Ridis
- Director: Mona Lolas

Previous National Board of Directors

TBA

== Membership ==
In addition to corporate membership, there are several personal membership categories:

- Associate Member: Members of the AMI are entitled to use the post nominal AMAMI, and have voting rights in the institute's elections as well as eligibility for appointment to the National Board and state council.
- Fellow: A Fellow is someone who has held membership with the AMI for at least 5 years. Fellows are entitled to use the post nominal FAMI CPM.
- International Member
- Student.
- Graduate. Graduating student members or new applicants get discounted membership for the first two years upon completion of their studies.

=== Certified Practising Marketer (CPM) ===
The AMI offers a designation for professional marketers - Certified Practising Marketer or CPM - recognition of formal education and successful application of marketing knowledge and skills.

To maintain their certification, CPMs are required to undertake a minimum of 100 hours of structured learning such as workshops, tertiary studies, forums and training.

== Awards ==
The annual Awards for Marketing Excellence were founded in 1982. The Awards recognises notable achievements across 18 categories and presented 7 special awards:

- Use of Artificial Intelligence in Marketing
- Brand Revitalisation
- Customer Acquisition Marketing
- Market and Consumer Insights
- Customer Retention
- Content Marketing
- Creativity in Brand, Product or Service Marketing
- Customer Experience Management Strategy
- Data Driven Marketing Strategy
- Product/Service Revitalisation
- Integrated Marketing Communications Program
- Not for Profit Marketing
- Public Sector Marketing
- Small Budget Marketing
- Social Change Marketing
- Social Media Marketing
- Sponsorship Effectiveness
- Omnichannel strategy

Special Awards

- Sir Charles McGrath Award
- Certified Practising Marketer of the Year
- Chief Marketing Officer of the Year
- Future Leader of the Year Award
- Campaign of the Year
- Marketing Team of the Year
- Best Marketing Agency

=== Past winners ===
Notable recipients include:

- Gail Kelly (2007)
