= Severny Vokzal =

Kazan Metro Station

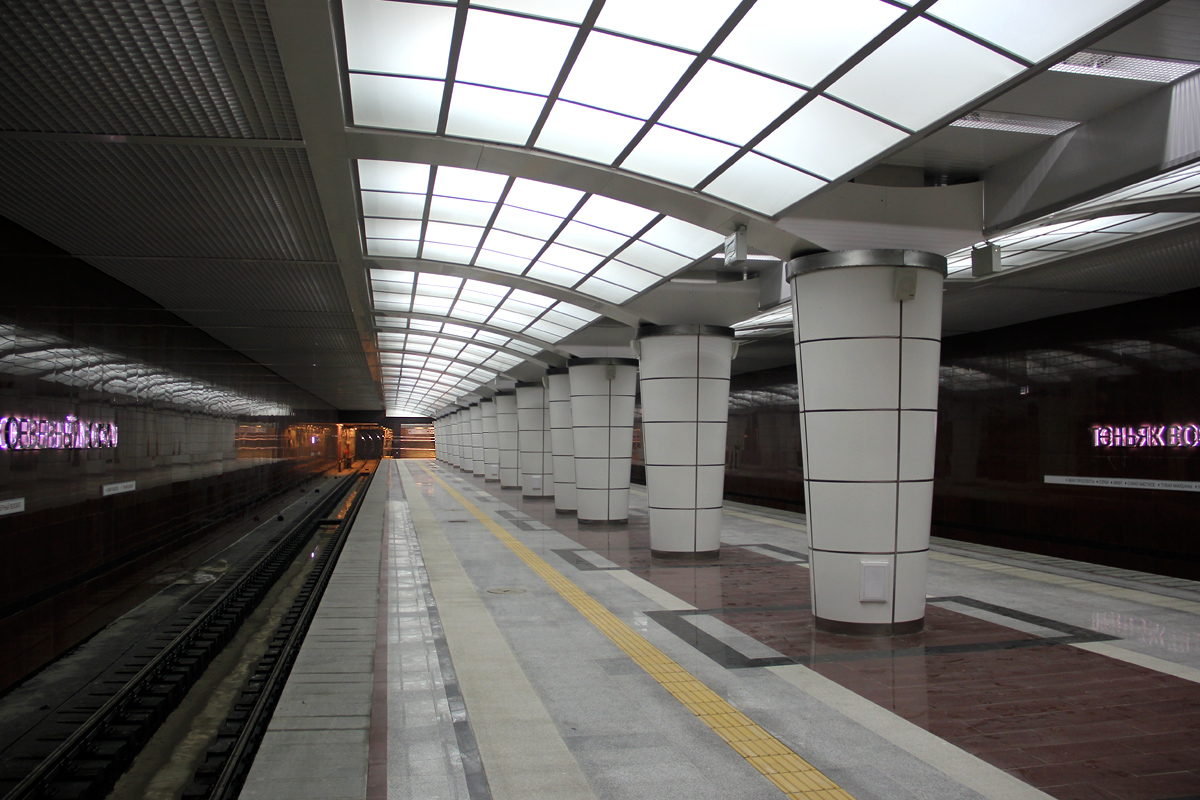

General information
- Coordinates: 55°50′29″N 49°04′54″E
- Owner: Kazan Metro
- Platforms: 1 Island platform
- Tracks: 2

History
- Opened: 9 May 2013

Services
Preceding station	Kazan Metro	Following station
Aviastroitelnaya Terminus	First Line	Yäşlek towards Dubravnaya
Location

Severny Vokzal (Russian: Северный вокзал, means Northern Rail Terminal) is a Russian metro station on the Kazan Metro that opened on 9 May 2013. It was part of the northern extension of the Kazan Metro along with Yäşlek and Aviastroitelnaya that opened on 9 May 2013.
