= Canton of Melun-Nord =

Coordinates: 48°33′35″N 2°40′51″E

Melun-Nord
- Former canton
- Interactive map of Melun-Nord
- Country: France
- Region: Île-de-France
- Department: Seine-et-Marne
- No. of communes: {{{nbcomm}}}
- Disbanded: 2015
- Area: 52.26 km^{2} (20.18 sq mi)
- Population (2012): 38,422
  - Density: 735.2/km^{2} (1,904/sq mi)

The canton of Melun-Nord is a French former administrative division, located in the arrondissement of Melun, in the Seine-et-Marne département (Île-de-France région). It was disbanded following the French canton reorganisation which came into effect in March 2015. It consisted of 7 communes, which joined the canton of Melun in 2015.

== Demographics ==
Historical population
Year	Pop.	±%
1999	37,015	—
2006	38,300	+3.5%
2012	38,422	+0.3%

== Composition ==
The canton of Melun-Nord was composed of 7 communes:

- Maincy
- Melun (partly)
- Montereau-sur-le-Jard
- Rubelles
- Saint-Germain-Laxis
- Vaux-le-Pénil
- Voisenon

== See also ==
- Cantons of the Seine-et-Marne department
- Communes of the Seine-et-Marne department
