= Canton of Melun-Sud =

Coordinates: 48°31′13″N 2°40′09″E

Melun-Sud
- Former canton
- Interactive map of Melun-Sud
- Country: France
- Region: Île-de-France
- Department: Seine-et-Marne
- No. of communes: {{{nbcomm}}}
- Disbanded: 2015
- Area: 14.47 km^{2} (5.59 sq mi)
- Population (2012): 23,684
  - Density: 1,637/km^{2} (4,239/sq mi)

The canton of Melun-Sud is a French former administrative division, located in the arrondissement of Melun, in the Seine-et-Marne département (Île-de-France région). It was disbanded following the French canton reorganisation which came into effect in March 2015. It consisted of 3 communes, which joined the canton of Melun in 2015.

== Demographics ==
Historical population
Year	Pop.	±%
1999	19,029	—
2006	21,321	+12.0%
2012	23,684	+11.1%

== Composition ==
The canton of Melun-Sud was composed of 3 communes:

- Livry-sur-Seine
- Melun (partly)
- La Rochette

== See also ==
- Cantons of the Seine-et-Marne department
- Communes of the Seine-et-Marne department
