= Pont de Maincy =

Painting by Paul Cézanne

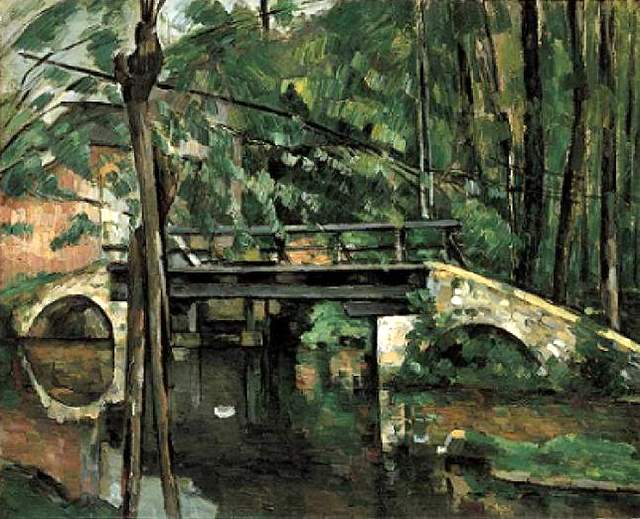
- Artist: Paul Cézanne
- Year: 1879-1880
- Medium: Oil on canvas
- Dimensions: 58.5 cm × 72.5 cm (23.0 in × 28.5 in)
- Location: Musée d'Orsay, Paris

The Pont de Maincy is an oil on canvas painting by the French painter Paul Cézanne, from 1879-1880. He resided during this period in Melun, a neighboring commune of Maincy, France. The work is held at the Musée d'Orsay, in Paris.

Main exhibitions: London (1914, 1996), Paris (1926, 1936, 1995, 2011), Beijing (1989), New York (2005).

== History, subject, and conservation ==
Created between 1879 and 1880 — the identification and dating of the work were not simple — it depicts a bridge that spanned the Almont in the commune of Maincy in France.

== Legacy ==
In 1993, the Peruvian painter Herman Braun-Vega referenced Pont de Maincy in Papaye à la guitare (Cézanne), a realistic inverted still life that dialogues the post-impressionism of Cézanne with a cubist guitar. The intrinsic light of Cézanne's landscape is doubled by the natural extrinsic light to the painting through the shadow play of a sophisticated frame. This painting is "a small confidential discourse between technicians" according to the artist.

== See also ==
- List of paintings by Paul Cézanne

== Notes and references ==
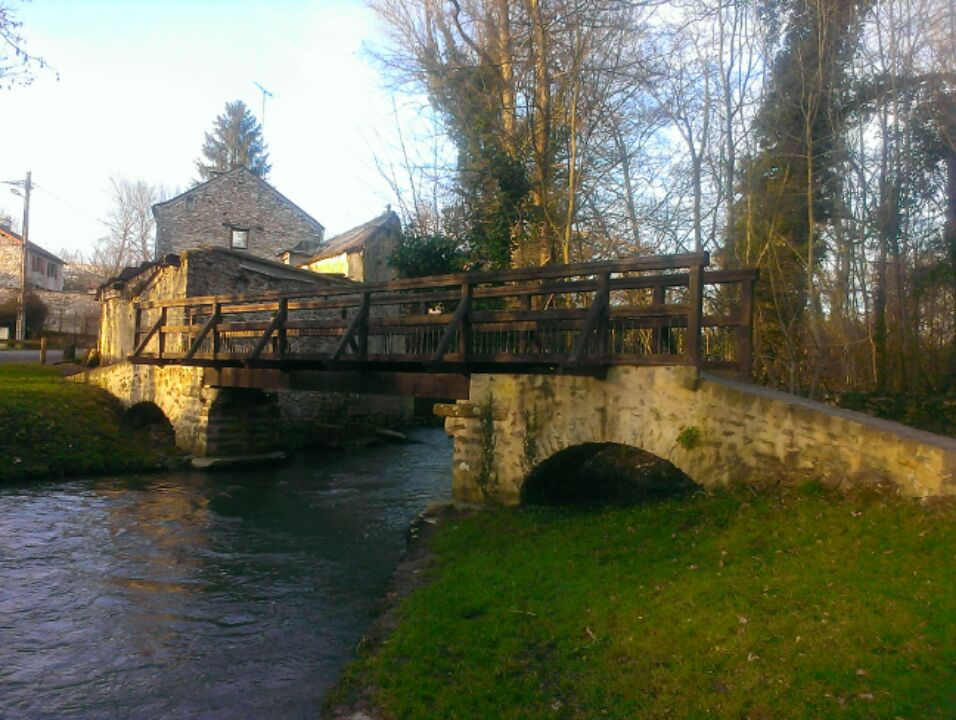
Pont de Maincy (77)

== Bibliography ==
- Bernard Dorival, Cézanne, Paris, Tisné, 1948.
- Joachim Gasquet, Cézanne, Paris, Bernheim jeune, 1921; reissued Paris, Encre Marine, 2002.
- Michel Hoog, Cézanne, « puissant et solitaire », Paris, Gallimard, coll. « Découvertes Gallimard / Arts » (No. 55), 2011.
- Lionello Venturi, Cézanne, son art, son œuvre, Paris, Rosenberg, 1936.
- Ambroise Vollard, Cézanne, Paris, Vollard, 1914.
- Ambroise Vollard, En écoutant Cézanne, Degas, Renoir, Paris, Grasset, 1938; reissued, Paris, Grasset, 1994.
