= Canton of Brie-Comte-Robert =

Coordinates: 48°40′54″N 2°39′19″E

Brie-Comte-Robert
- Former canton
- Interactive map of Brie-Comte-Robert
- Country: France
- Region: Île-de-France
- Department: Seine-et-Marne
- No. of communes: {{{nbcomm}}}
- Disbanded: 2015
- Area: 145.04 km^{2} (56.00 sq mi)
- Population (2012): 42,992
  - Density: 296.41/km^{2} (767.71/sq mi)

The canton of Brie-Comte-Robert is a French former administrative division, located in the arrondissement of Melun, in the Seine-et-Marne département (Île-de-France région). It was disbanded following the French canton reorganisation which came into effect in March 2015.

== Demographics ==
Historical population
Year	Pop.	±%
1999	37,160	—
2006	40,179	+8.1%
2012	42,992	+7.0%

== Composition ==
The canton of Brie-Comte-Robert was composed of 12 communes:

- Brie-Comte-Robert
- Chevry-Cossigny
- Coubert
- Évry-Grégy-sur-Yerre
- Férolles-Attilly
- Grisy-Suisnes
- Lésigny
- Limoges-Fourches
- Lissy
- Servon
- Soignolles-en-Brie
- Solers

== See also ==
- Cantons of the Seine-et-Marne department
- Communes of the Seine-et-Marne department
