= Réau =

- Commune
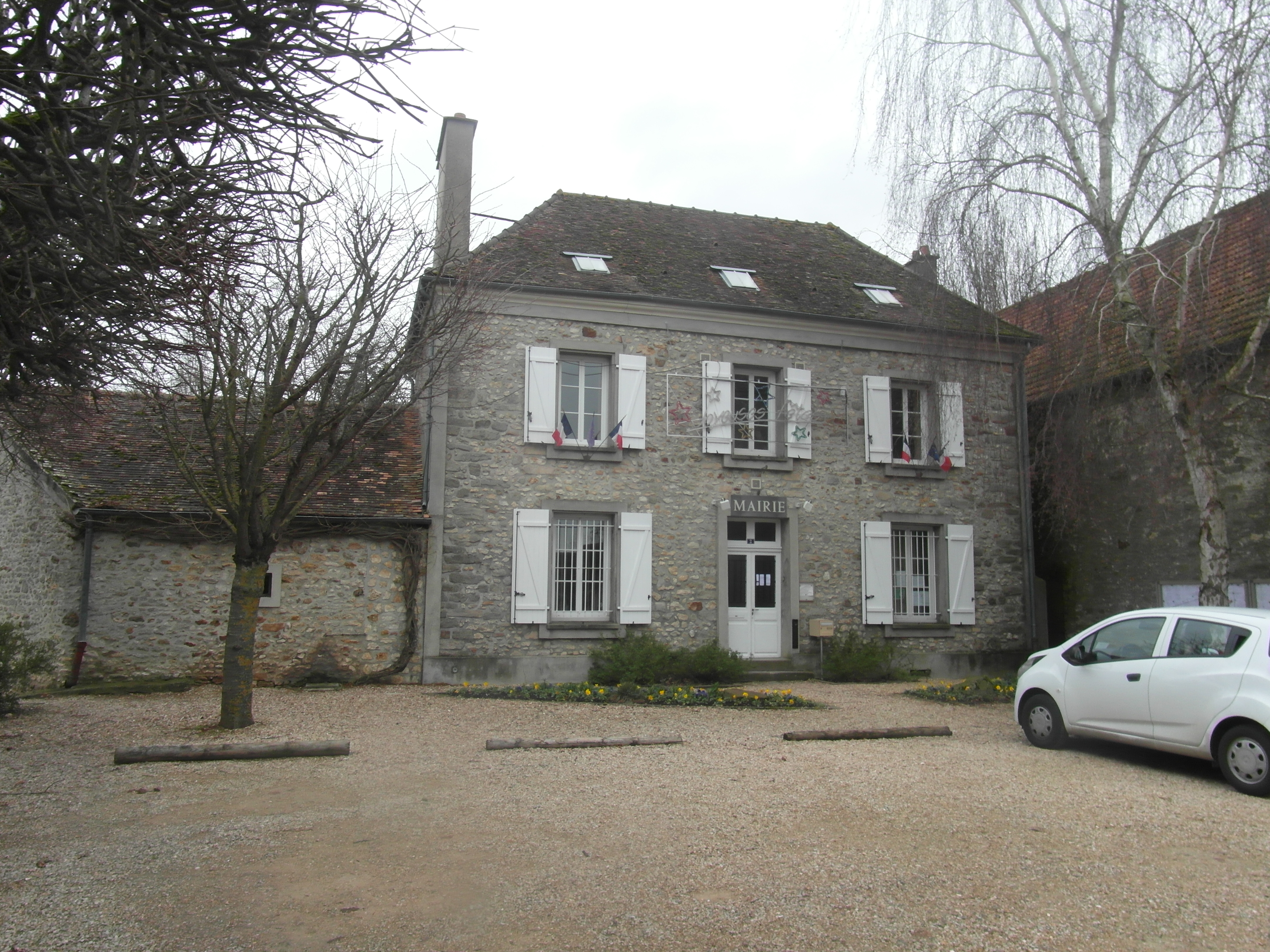
- The town hall in Réau
- Location of Réau
- Location within France Location within Île-de-France (region)
- Coordinates: 48°37′17″N 2°37′23″E
- Country: France
- Region: Île-de-France
- Department: Seine-et-Marne
- Arrondissement: Melun
- Canton: Combs-la-Ville
- Intercommunality: CA Grand Paris Sud Seine-Essonne-Sénart

Government
  - Mayor (2020–2026): Alain Auzet
- Area^{1}: 13.32 km^{2} (5.14 sq mi)
- Highest elevation: 94 m (308 ft)
- Lowest elevation: 82 m (269 ft)
- Population (2023): 2,127
  - Density: 159.7/km^{2} (413.6/sq mi)
- Time zone: UTC+01:00 (CET)
  - Summer (DST): UTC+02:00 (CEST)
- INSEE/Postal code: 77384 /77550
- ^{1} French Land Register data, which excludes lakes, ponds, glaciers > 1 km^{2} (0.386 sq mi or 247 acres) and river estuaries.

Réau (French pronunciation: [ʁeo]) is a commune in the Seine-et-Marne department in the Île-de-France region in north-central France.

== Ferme de Galande ==
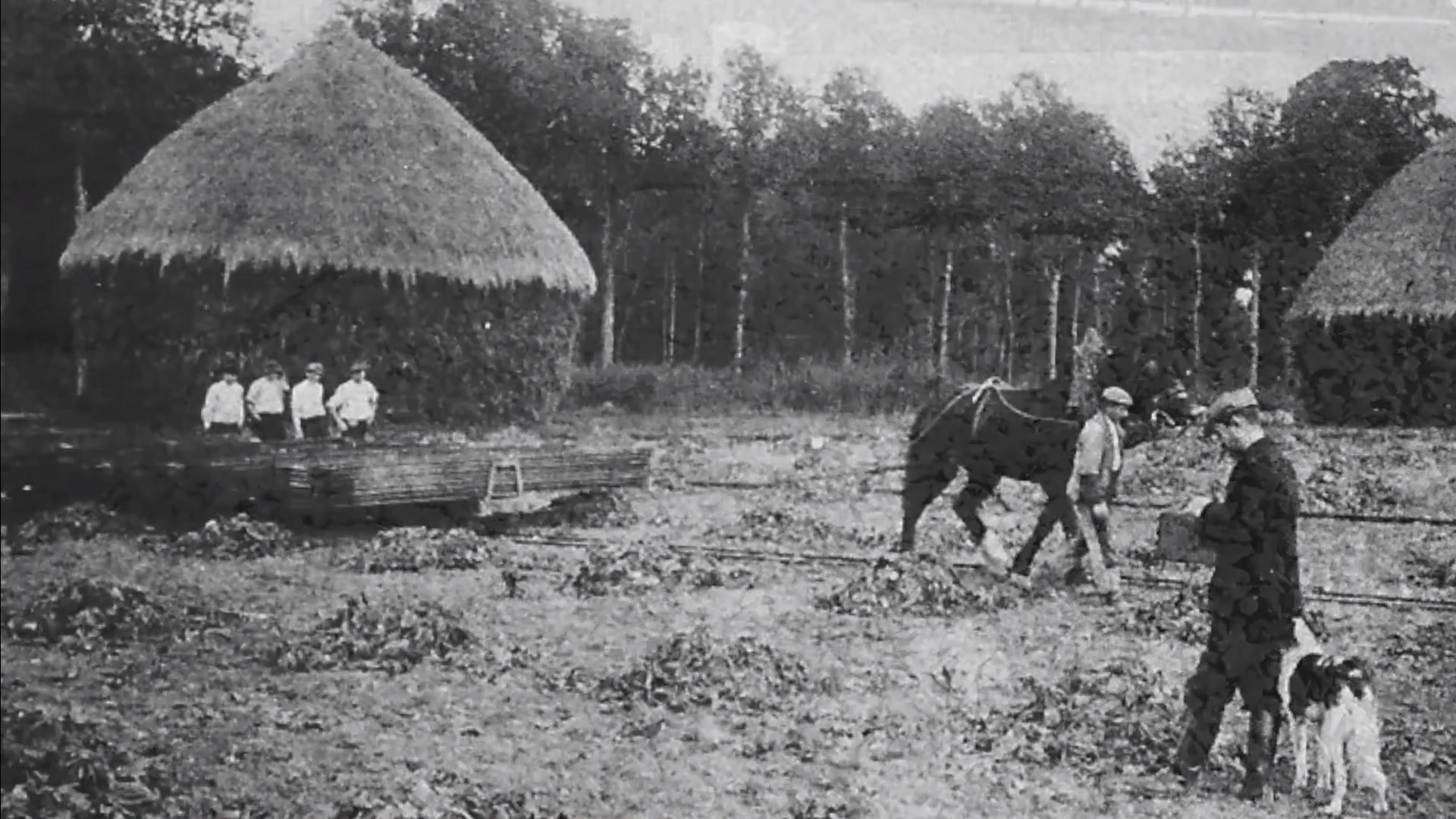
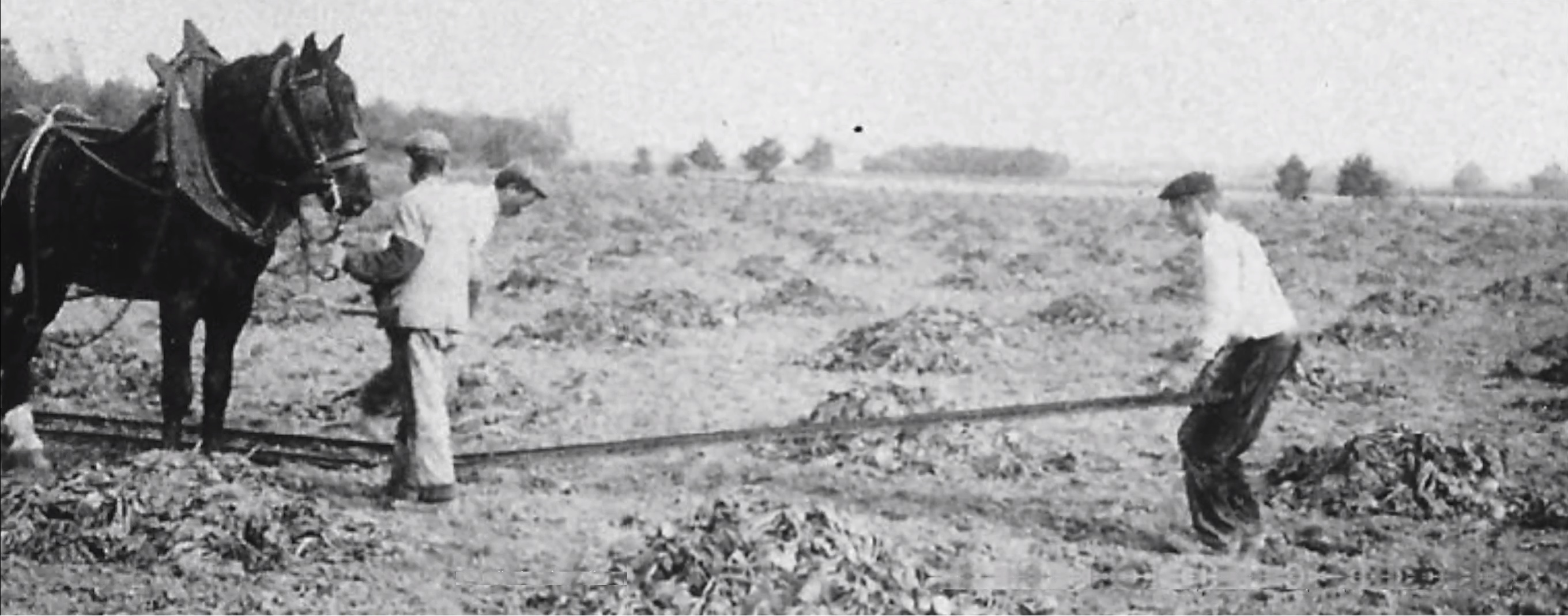
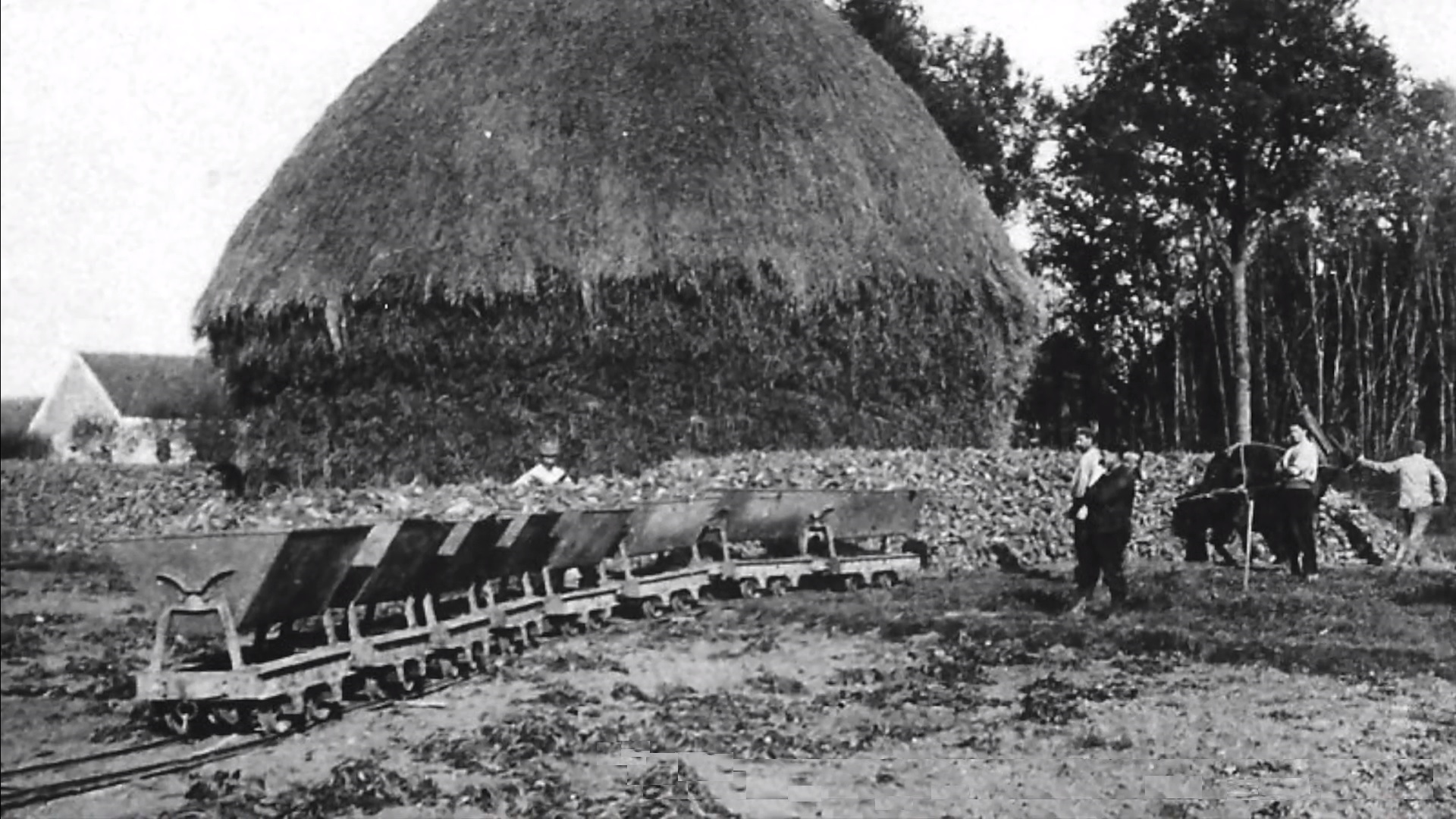
Decauville railway of the sugar beet producer Arthur Brandin in Réau around 1881

Around 1881, sugar beet producer Arthur Brandin invested in a Decauville railway with eight horse-drawn tipping lorries for the Ferme de Galande near Réau, 15 km east of the Decauville factory in Petit Bourg. As well as being a sugar beet farmer, he was also mayor of Réau and Republican Consul of the Canton of Brie-Comte-Robert from 1895 to 1912. The surface soil of his sugar beet fields consisted of clay in which fragments of siliceous sandstone were embedded, used for millstones and structural purposes. The subsoil was limestone, so the fields were often very muddy at harvest time until Brandin installed an innovatively designed drainage system.

== Demographics ==
The inhabitants are called Réaltais in French.

Historical population
Year	Pop.	±% p.a.
1968	497	—
1975	525	+0.79%
1982	509	−0.44%
1990	663	+3.36%
1999	705	+0.68%
2007	1,009	+4.58%
2012	1,548	+8.94%
2017	1,834	+3.45%
2023	2,127	+2.50%
Source: INSEE

== See also ==
- Communes of the Seine-et-Marne department
