= Seine-Port =

- Commune
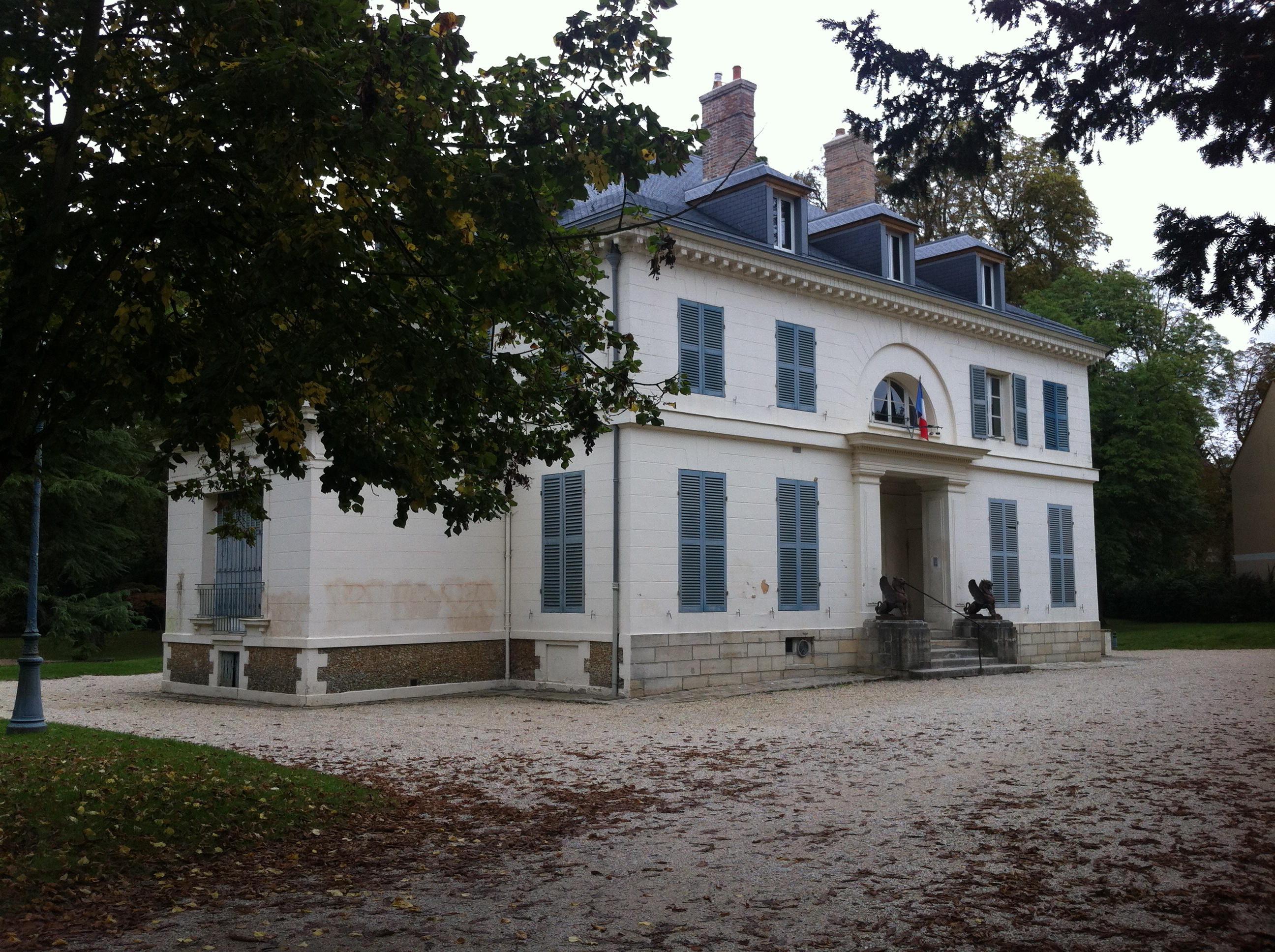
- The town hall in Seine-Port

- Coat of arms
- Location of Seine-Port
- Location within France Location within Île-de-France (region)
- Coordinates: 48°33′25″N 2°33′14″E
- Country: France
- Region: Île-de-France
- Department: Seine-et-Marne
- Arrondissement: Melun
- Canton: Saint-Fargeau-Ponthierry
- Intercommunality: CA Melun Val de Seine

Government
  - Mayor (2020–2026): Vincent Paul-Petit
- Area^{1}: 8.53 km^{2} (3.29 sq mi)
- Highest elevation: 85 m (279 ft)
- Lowest elevation: 37 m (121 ft)
- Population (2023): 1,742
  - Density: 204/km^{2} (529/sq mi)
- Time zone: UTC+01:00 (CET)
  - Summer (DST): UTC+02:00 (CEST)
- INSEE/Postal code: 77447 /77240
- ^{1} French Land Register data, which excludes lakes, ponds, glaciers > 1 km^{2} (0.386 sq mi or 247 acres) and river estuaries.

Seine-Port (French pronunciation: [sɛn pɔʁ]) is a commune in the Seine-et-Marne department in the Île-de-France region in north-central France.

== Demographics ==
Inhabitants of Seine-Port are called Seine-Portais.

== See also ==
- Communes of the Seine-et-Marne department
