= Communauté d'agglomération Melun Val de Seine =

Coordinates: 48.54°N 2.66°E

Melun Val de Seine
- Communauté d'agglomération
- Country: France
- Region: Île-de-France
- Department: Seine-et-Marne
- No. of communes: {{{nbcomm}}}
- Established: January 2002

Government
  - President: Franck Vernin
- Area: 153.21 km^{2} (59.15 sq mi)
- Population (2018): 131,924
  - Density: 861.07/km^{2} (2,230.2/sq mi)
- Website: www.melunvaldeseine.fr

The Communauté d'agglomération Melun Val de Seine is a communauté d'agglomération in the Seine-et-Marne département and in the Île-de-France région of France, centred on the city of Melun. Its area is 153.2 km^{2}. Its population was 131,924 in 2018, of which 39,947 in Melun proper.

== Composition ==
Since 1 January 2017, the Communauté d'agglomération Melun Val de Seine includes 20 communes:

1. Boissettes
2. Boissise-la-Bertrand
3. Boissise-le-Roi
4. Dammarie-lès-Lys
5. La Rochette
6. Le Mée-sur-Seine
7. Limoges-Fourches
8. Lissy
9. Livry-sur-Seine
10. Maincy
11. Melun
12. Montereau-sur-le-Jard
13. Pringy
14. Rubelles
15. Saint-Fargeau-Ponthierry
16. Saint-Germain-Laxis
17. Seine-Port
18. Vaux-le-Pénil
19. Villiers-en-Bière
20. Voisenon

== See also ==
- Communes of the Seine-et-Marne department
