= Vaux-le-Vicomte =

Baroque French château in Maincy

Coordinates: 48.564851°N 2.714°E

Château de Vaux-le-Vicomte
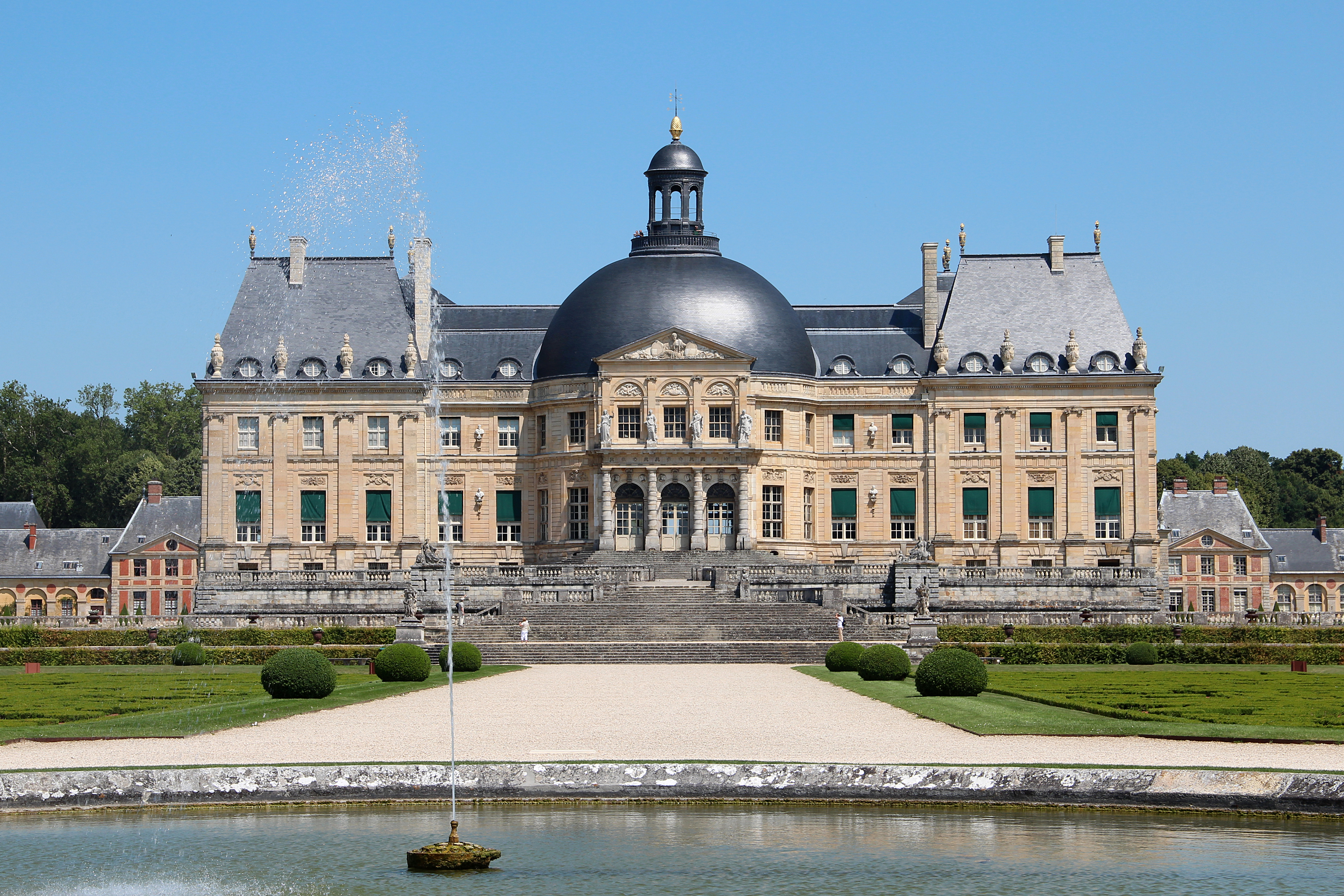
- View from the rond d'eau of the garden

General information
- Type: Château
- Architectural style: Baroque
- Location: Maincy, France
- Construction started: 1656
- Completed: 1661

Design and construction
- Architect: Louis Le Vau

The Château de Vaux-le-Vicomte (French pronunciation: [ʃato d(ə) vo l(ə) vikɔ̃t]) or simply Vaux-le-Vicomte is a Baroque French château located in Maincy, near Melun, 55 km (34 mi) southeast of Paris in the Seine-et-Marne department of Île-de-France.

Built between 1658 and 1661 for Nicolas Fouquet, Marquis de Belle Île, Viscount of Melun and Vaux, the Superintendent of Finances of Louis XIV, the château was an influential work of architecture in mid-17th-century Europe. At Vaux-le-Vicomte, the architect Louis Le Vau, the landscape architect André Le Nôtre and the painter-decorator Charles Le Brun worked together on a large-scale project for the first time. Their collaboration marked the beginning of the Louis XIV style combining architecture, interior design and landscape design. The garden's pronounced visual axis is an example of this style.

== History ==
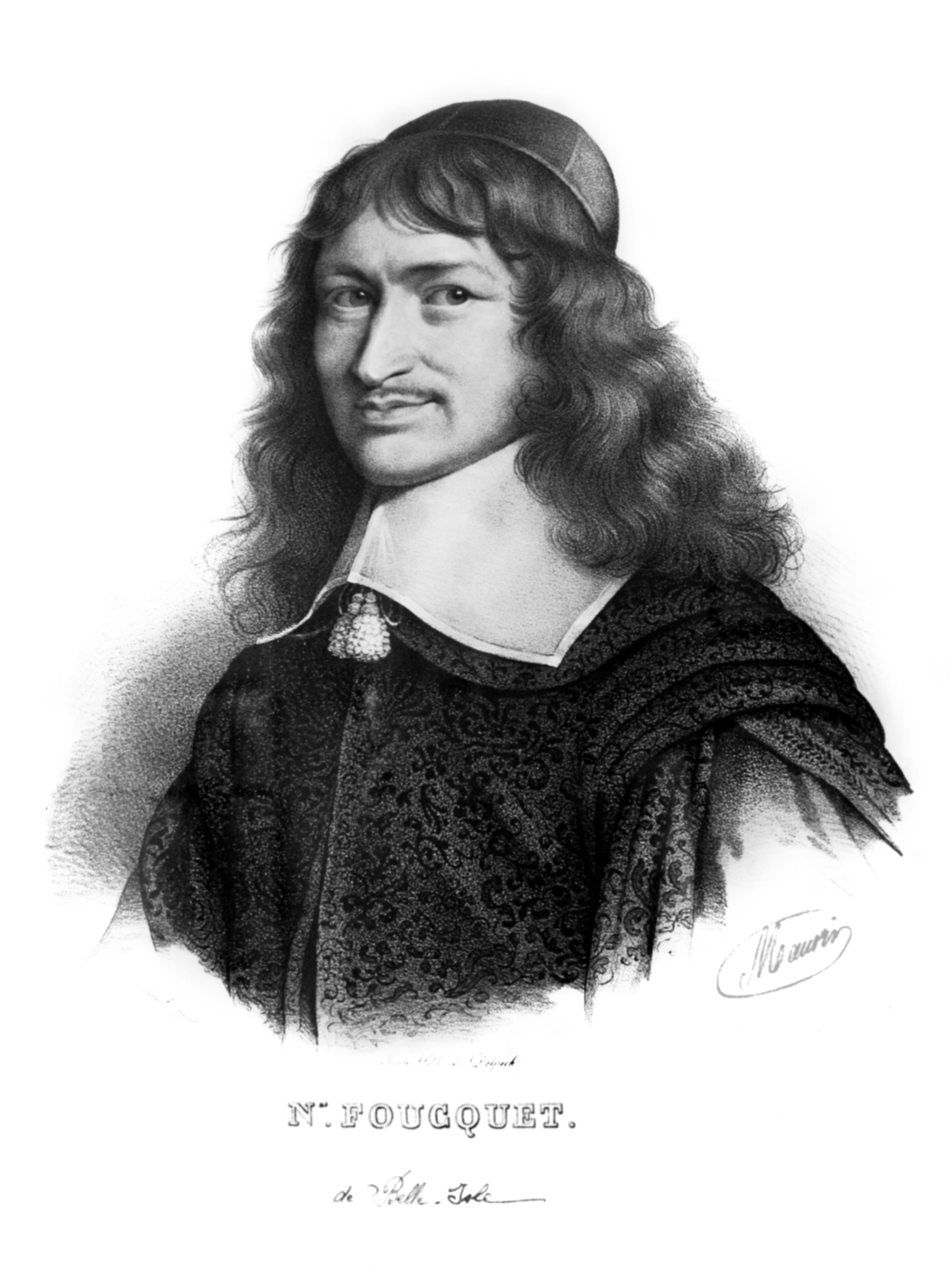
Fouquet

Once a small château between the royal residences of Vincennes and Fontainebleau, the estate of Vaux-le-Vicomte was purchased in 1641 by Nicolas Fouquet, an ambitious 26-year-old member of the Parlement of Paris. Fouquet was an avid patron of the arts, attracting many artists with his generosity.

When Fouquet became King Louis XIV's Superintendent of Finances in 1656, he commissioned Le Vau, Le Brun and Le Nôtre to renovate his estate and garden to match his grand ambition. Fouquet's artistic and cultivated personality subsequently brought out the best in the three.

To secure the necessary grounds for the elaborate plans for Vaux-le-Vicomte's garden and castle, Fouquet purchased and demolished three villages. The displaced villagers were then employed in the upkeep and maintenance of the gardens. It was said to have employed 18,000 workers and cost as much as 16 million livres.

The château and its patron became for a short time a focus for fine feasts, literature and arts. The fabulist and poet Jean de La Fontaine and the playwright Molière were among the artists close to Fouquet. At the inauguration of Vaux-le-Vicomte, a Molière play was performed, along with a dinner event organized by François Vatel and an impressive firework show.

=== Fête and arrest ===
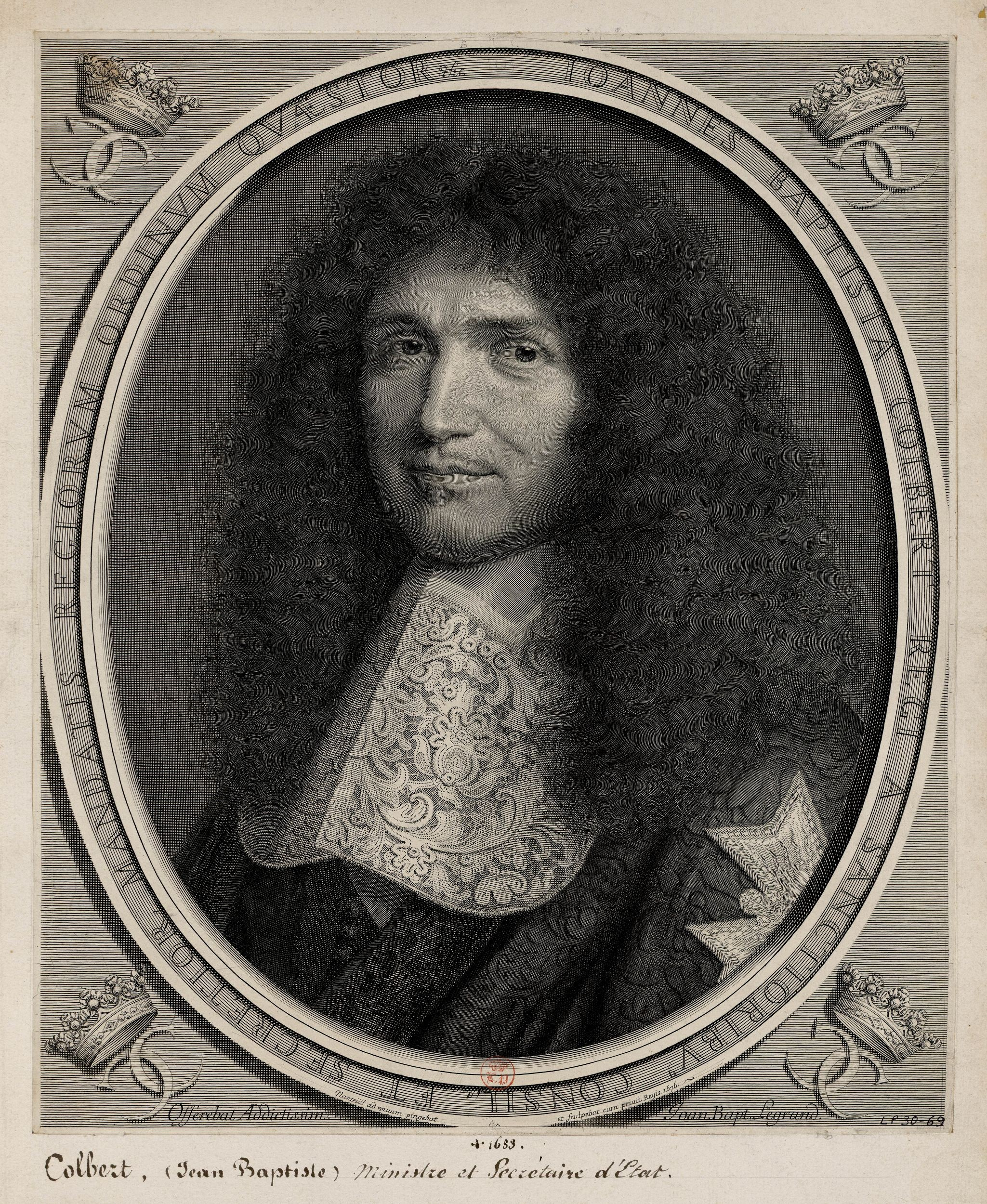
Colbert

The château was lavish, refined and dazzling to behold, and Fouquet hoped that hosting Louis XIV there would restore him to favour; indeed, part of Vaux-le-Vicomte was actually constructed specifically for the king. On the 17th of August 1661, Fouquet held an opulent fête in the king's honour, featuring fireworks, a grand feast, and the premiere of Molière's play 'Les Fâcheux'. However, the king was unmoved by Fouquet's attempt to flatter him, and on the 5th of September 1661, following a council held in Nantes, Louis XIV had Fouquet arrested by d'Artagnan.

The two events took place within weeks of each other, and although it is a popular misconception that the existence of the Vaux-le-Vicomte and the extravagant fête caused Fouquet's downfall, Louis XIV – having been persuaded by Jean-Baptiste Colbert that Fouquet had become too powerful and was therefore a threat to the monarch – had already decided to remove Fouquet from power months before the famous fête ever took place. Indeed, the king had in fact visited the residence twice before, and contemporary accounts report that he showed no signs of dissatisfaction with its level of magnificence and splendour at that time.

=== After Fouquet ===
After Fouquet was arrested and imprisoned for life and his wife exiled, Vaux-le-Vicomte was placed under sequestration. The king seized, confiscated or purchased 120 tapestries, the statues and all the orange trees from Vaux-le-Vicomte. He then sent the team of artists (Le Vau, Le Nôtre and Le Brun) to design what would be a much larger project than Vaux-le-Vicomte, the palace and gardens of Versailles.

Madame Fouquet recovered her property 10 years later and retired there with her eldest son. In 1705, after the death of her husband and son, she put Vaux-le-Vicomte up for sale.

=== Recent history ===
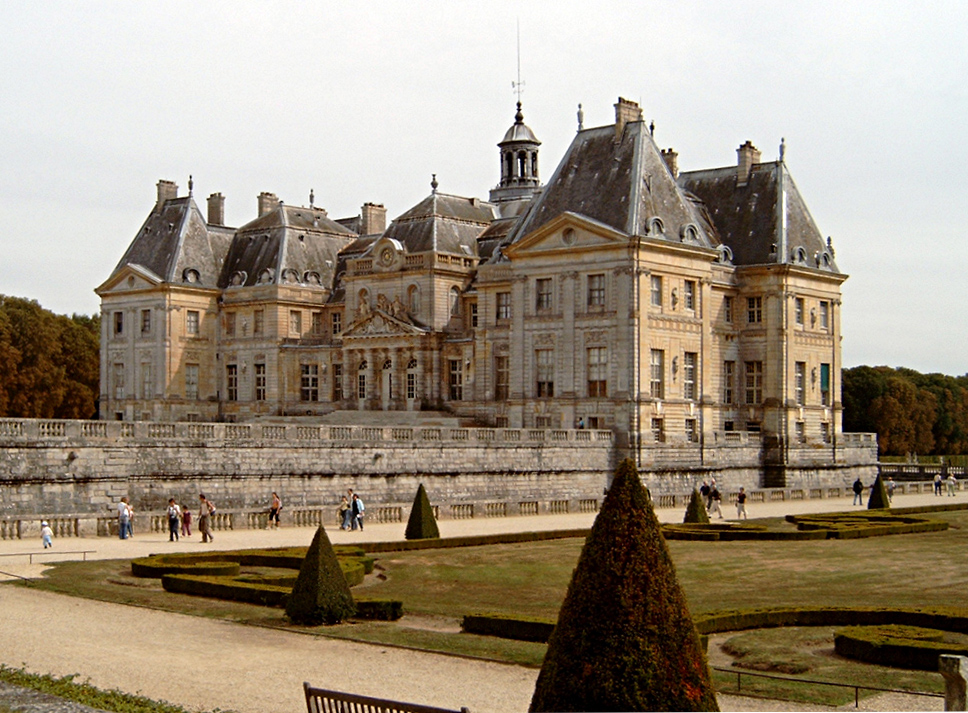
Rhythmic massing of the entrance front

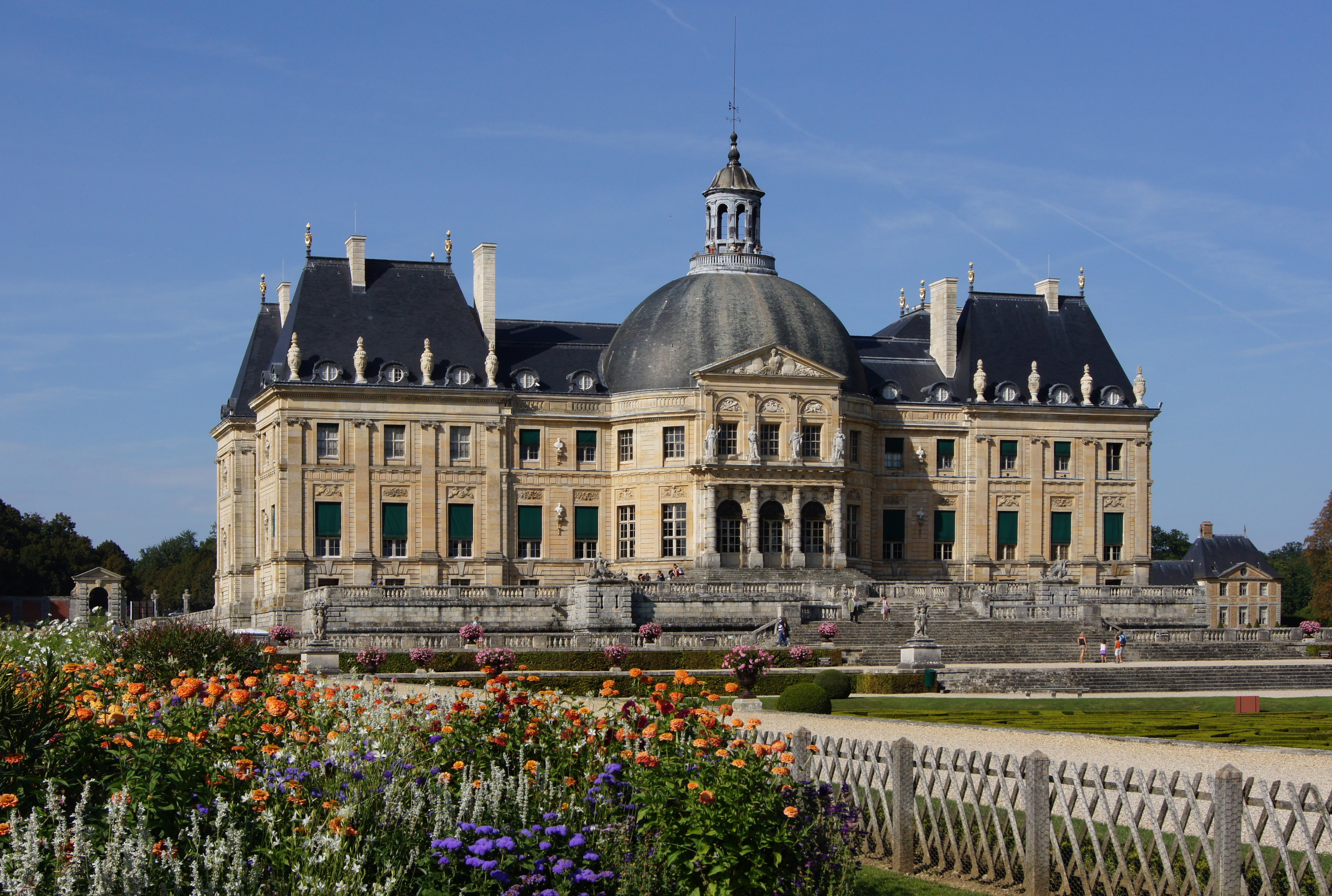
View of the garden front

Marshal Claude Louis Hector de Villars became the new owner without seeing the château. In 1764, the Marshal's son sold the estate to the Duke of Praslin, whose descendants maintained the property for over a century. It is sometimes mistakenly reported that the château was the scene of a murder in 1847, when Charles de Choiseul-Praslin killed his wife in her bedroom, but he did so at their Paris residence, rather than at Vaux-le-Vicomte.

In 1875, after thirty years of neglect, the estate was sold to Alfred Sommier in a public auction. "He came for the [Charles] Le Brun paintings, especially those on the ceiling of the Chambre des Muses – he loved art," according to descendant Alexandre de Vogüé. The château was empty, some of the outbuildings had fallen into ruin and the gardens were completely overgrown. Restoration and refurbishment began under the direction of the architect Gabriel-Hippolyte Destailleur, assisted by the landscape architect Elie Lainé. When Sommier died in 1908, the château and the gardens had recovered their original appearance. His son, Edme Sommier, and his daughter-in-law completed the task. His descendants continue to preserve the château, which remains privately owned.

Since 1967, the owner has been the Count and Countess de Vogüé, who are Patrice de Vogüé, Alfred Sommier's great-grandson, and his wife Cristina, who received it as a wedding present. By that time, the estate contained only a few pieces that had originally been owned by Fouquet. For some time, the family occupied the first floor, and then the refurbished stables. Vaux-le-Vicomte is the largest private château in France, and has 1,235 acres of gardens.

In 1968, the property was opened for public tours. A major restoration was completed starting in 1976 and was continuing in 2017; the roof repair alone took six years. The Baroque ceiling in the Chambre des Muses, "decorated by Charles Le Brun's workshop", was restored in 2016–2017 and was first shown to the public in March 2017. The business is now administered by their three sons: Alexandre, Jean-Charles and Ascanio de Vogüé. "We don’t care about the aristocratic part of this life," said Alexandre de Vogüé, but they are determined to continue the preservation. "We have a ten-year plan, detailing what to do and when; a plan that includes a project of infrastructure restoration, restoration of the garden, and smaller projects; all with anticipated costs next to it. We make this list public for our donors, and people can sponsor a special project, such as restoring a statue in the garden," Alexandre told a reporter in 2017.

Approximately 300,000 visitors arrive each year, 75% of them from France. Recognized by the state as a monument historique, the property is open most of the year. During the Christmas season, major decorations are installed: in 2018 there were 150 trees, 10,000 items and 4,000 metres (4,400 yards) of garlands and lights installed, as well as a giant illuminated squirrel and angel. The property is closed for approximately two months in winter, for example in 2019 from 6 January to 22 March.

== Features ==
=== Architecture ===
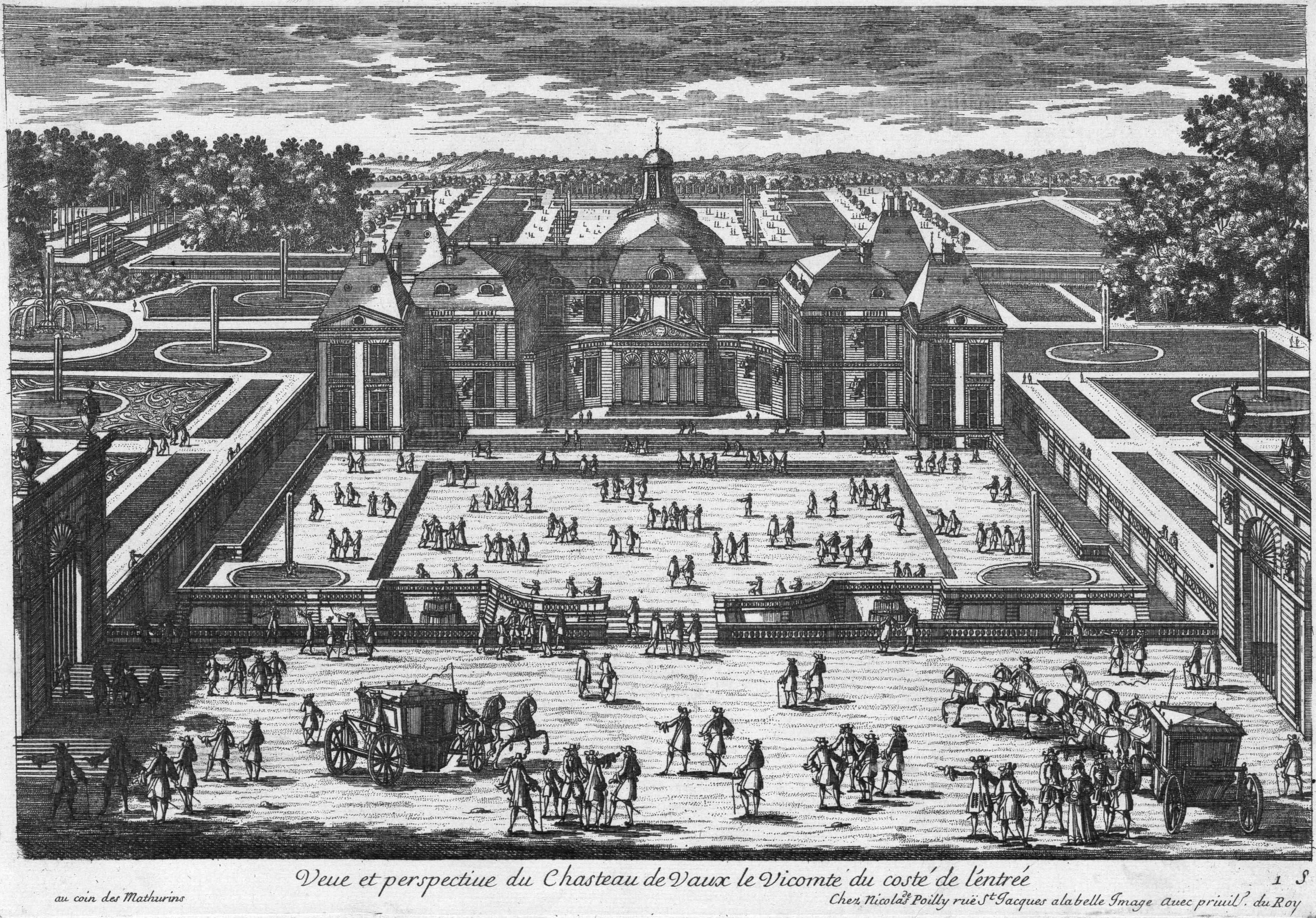
Engraving of the entrance front

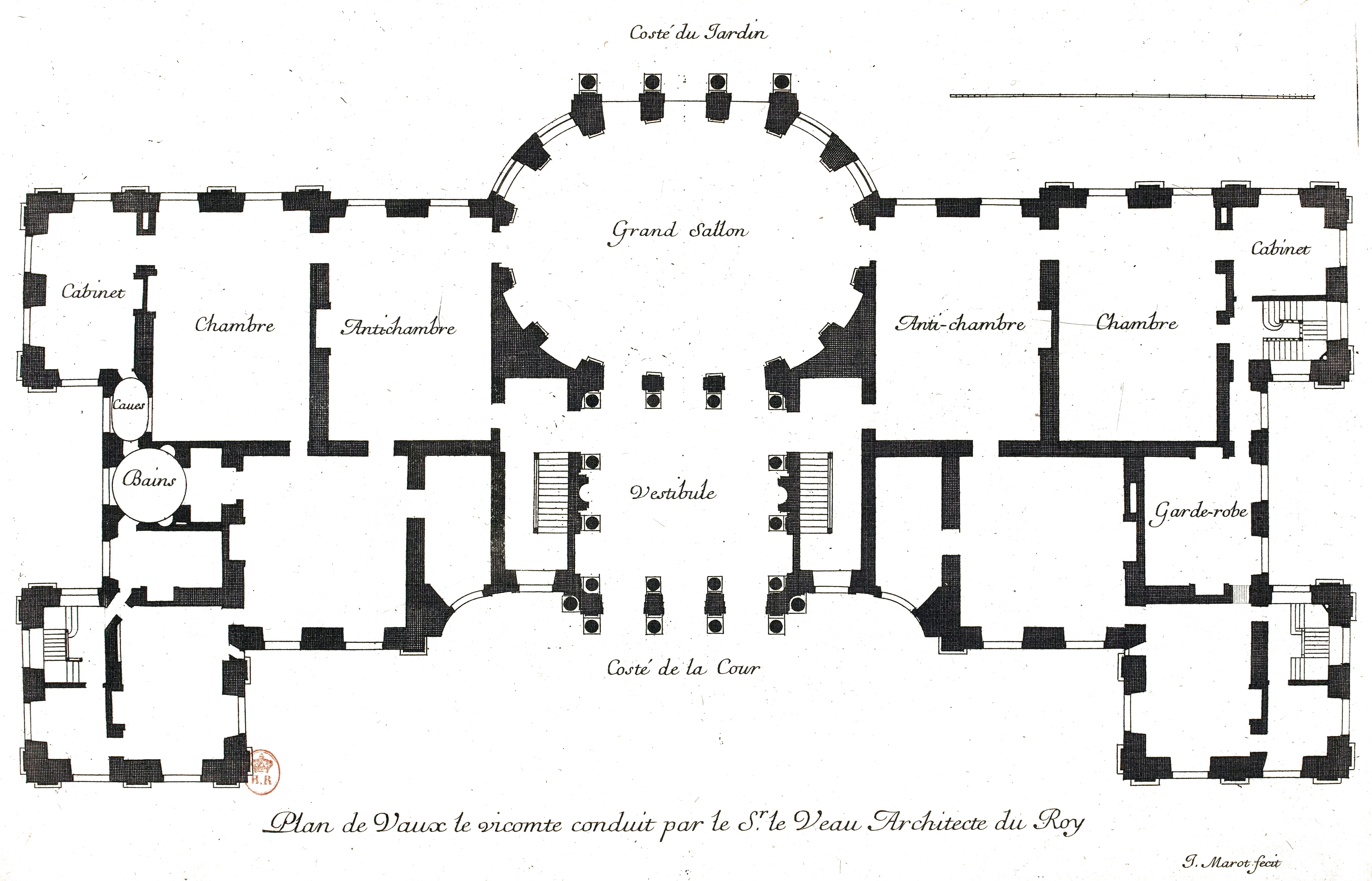
Plan of the ground floor, as engraved by Jean Marot

The château is situated near the northern end of a 1.5-kilometre (0.93 mi) long north–south axis with the entrance front facing north. Its elevations are perfectly symmetrical to either side of this axis. Somewhat surprisingly the interior plan is also nearly completely symmetrical with few differences between the eastern and western halves. The two rooms in the centre, the entrance vestibule to the north and the oval salon to the south, were originally an open-air loggia, dividing the château into two distinct sections. The interior decoration of these two rooms was therefore more typical of an outdoor setting. Three sets of three arches, those on the entrance front, three more between the vestibule and the salon, and the three leading from the salon to the garden are all aligned and permitted the arriving visitor to see through to the central axis of the garden before entering the château. The exterior arches could be closed with iron gates and only later were filled in with glass doors and the interior arches with mirrored doors. Since the loggia divided the building into two halves, there are two symmetrical staircases on either side of it, rather than a single staircase. The rooms in the eastern half of the house were intended for the use of the king, those in the western half were for Fouquet. The provision of a suite of rooms for the king was normal practice in aristocratic houses of the time, since the king travelled frequently.

Another surprising feature of the plan is the thickness of the main body of the building (corps de logis), which consists of two rows of rooms running east and west. Traditionally, the middle of the corps de logis of French châteaux consisted of a single row of rooms. Double-thick corps de logis had already been used in hôtels particuliers in Paris, including Le Vau's Hôtel Tambonneau, but Vaux was the first château to incorporate this change. Even more unusual, the main rooms are all on the ground floor rather than the first floor (the traditional piano nobile). This accounts for the lack of a grand staircase or a gallery, standard elements of most contemporary châteaux. Also noteworthy are corridors in the basement and on the first floor, which run the length of house, providing privacy to the rooms they access. Up to the middle of the 17th century, corridors were essentially unknown. Another feature of the plan, the four pavilions, one at each corner of the building, is more conventional.

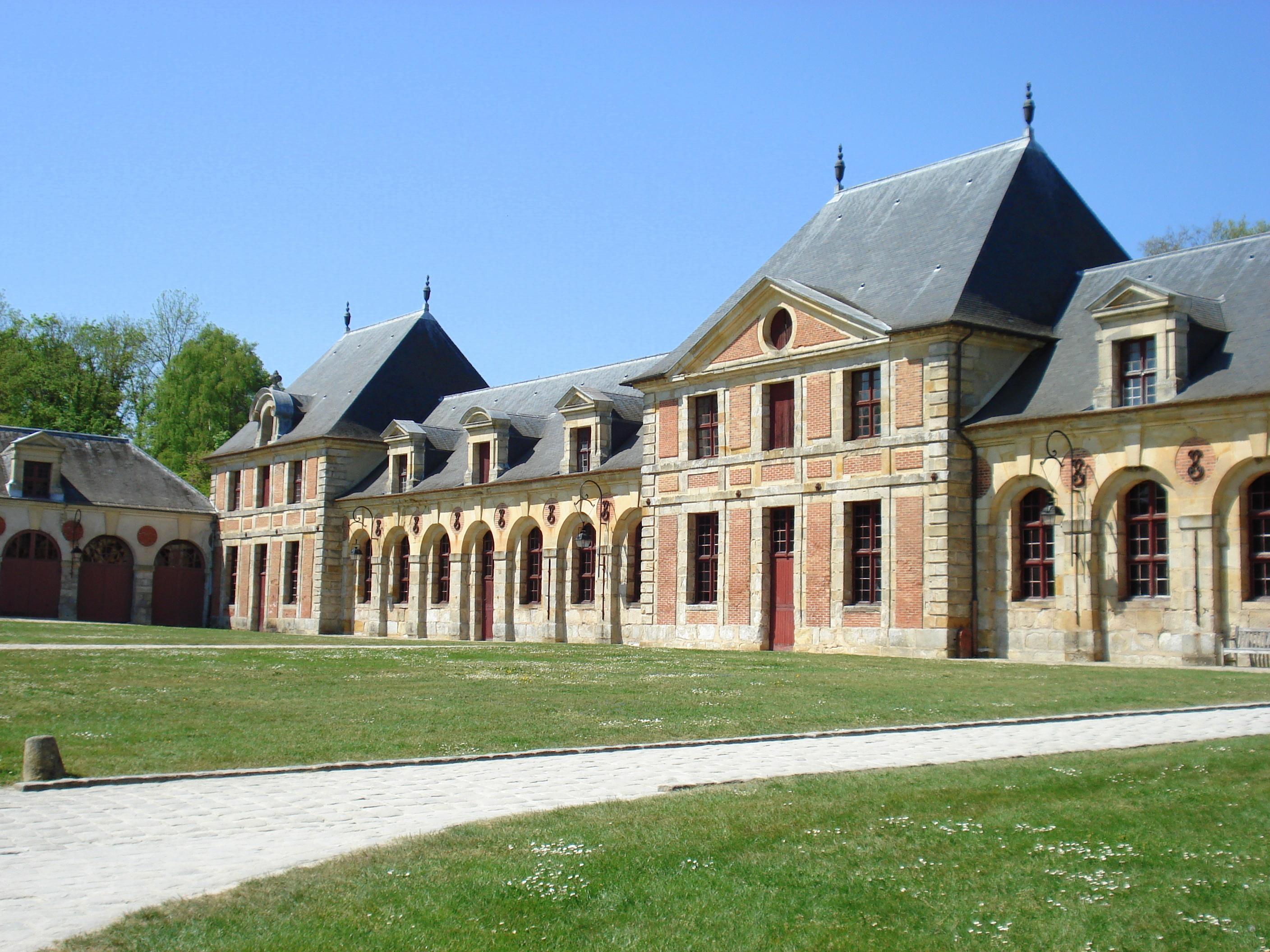
Service building in brick and stone

Vaux-le-Vicomte was originally planned to be constructed in brick and stone, but after the mid-century, as the middle classes began to imitate this style, aristocratic circles began using stone exclusively. Rather late in the design process, Fouquet and Le Vau switched to stone, a decision that may have been influenced by the use of stone at François Mansart's Château de Maisons. The service buildings flanking the large avant-cour to the north of the house remained in brick and stone, and other structures preceding them were in rubble-stone and plaster, a social ranking of building materials that would be common in France for a considerable length of time thereafter.

Moated platform

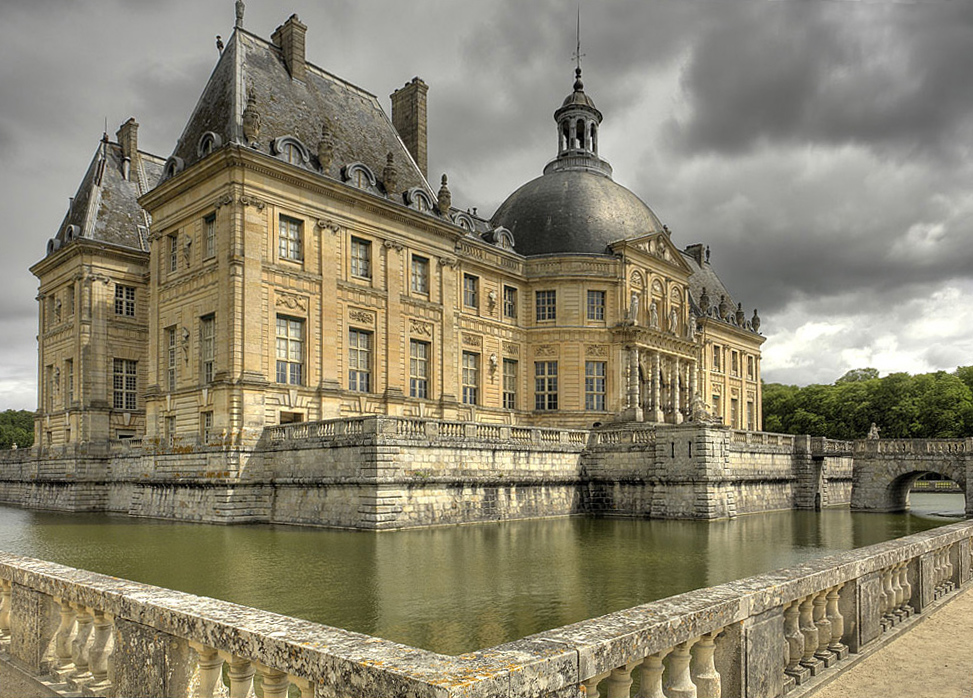
Perspective view from the garden showing the moat and bridge

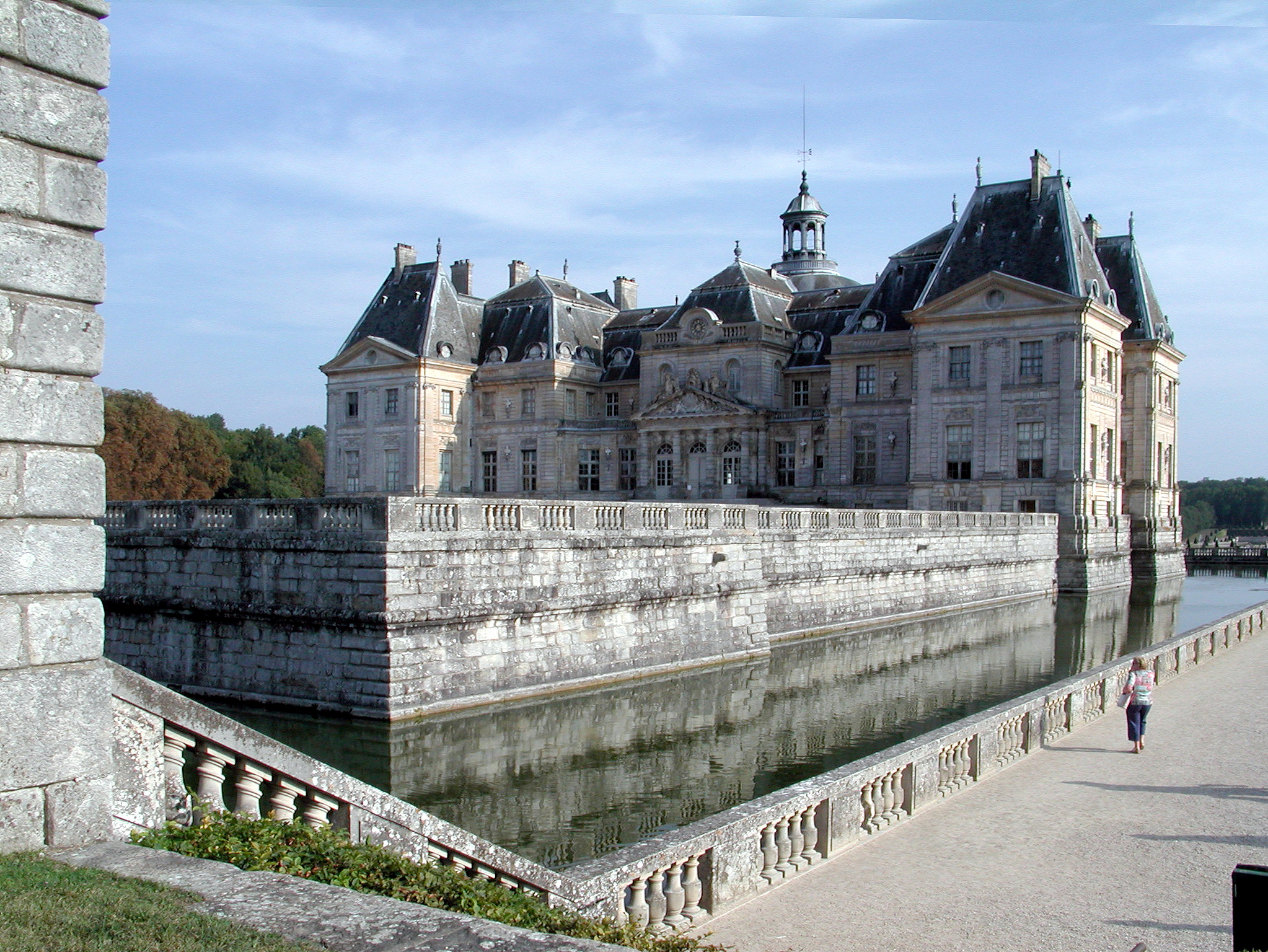
View of the forecourt platform and the moat surrounding it

The main château is constructed entirely on a moated platform, reached via two bridges, both aligned with the central axis and placed on the north and south sides. The moat is a picturesque holdover from medieval fortified residences, and is again a feature that Le Vau may have borrowed from Maisons. The moat at Vaux may also have been inspired by the previous château on the site, which Le Vau's work replaced.

The bridge over the moat on the north side leads from the avant-cour to an ample forecourt, flanked by raised terraces on either side, a layout evoking the cour d'honneur of older aristocratic houses in which the entrance court was enclosed by anterior wings, typically housing kitchens and domestic quarters. Le Vau's terraces even terminate in larger squares suggesting former pavilions. In more modern residences, like Vaux, it had become the custom to put these facilities in the basement, so these structures were no longer needed. This U-shaped plan of the house with the terraces is a device that again recalls Maisons, where Mansart intended "to indicate that his château was conceived in a noble tradition of French design while at the same time emphasizing its modernity in comparison to predecessors."

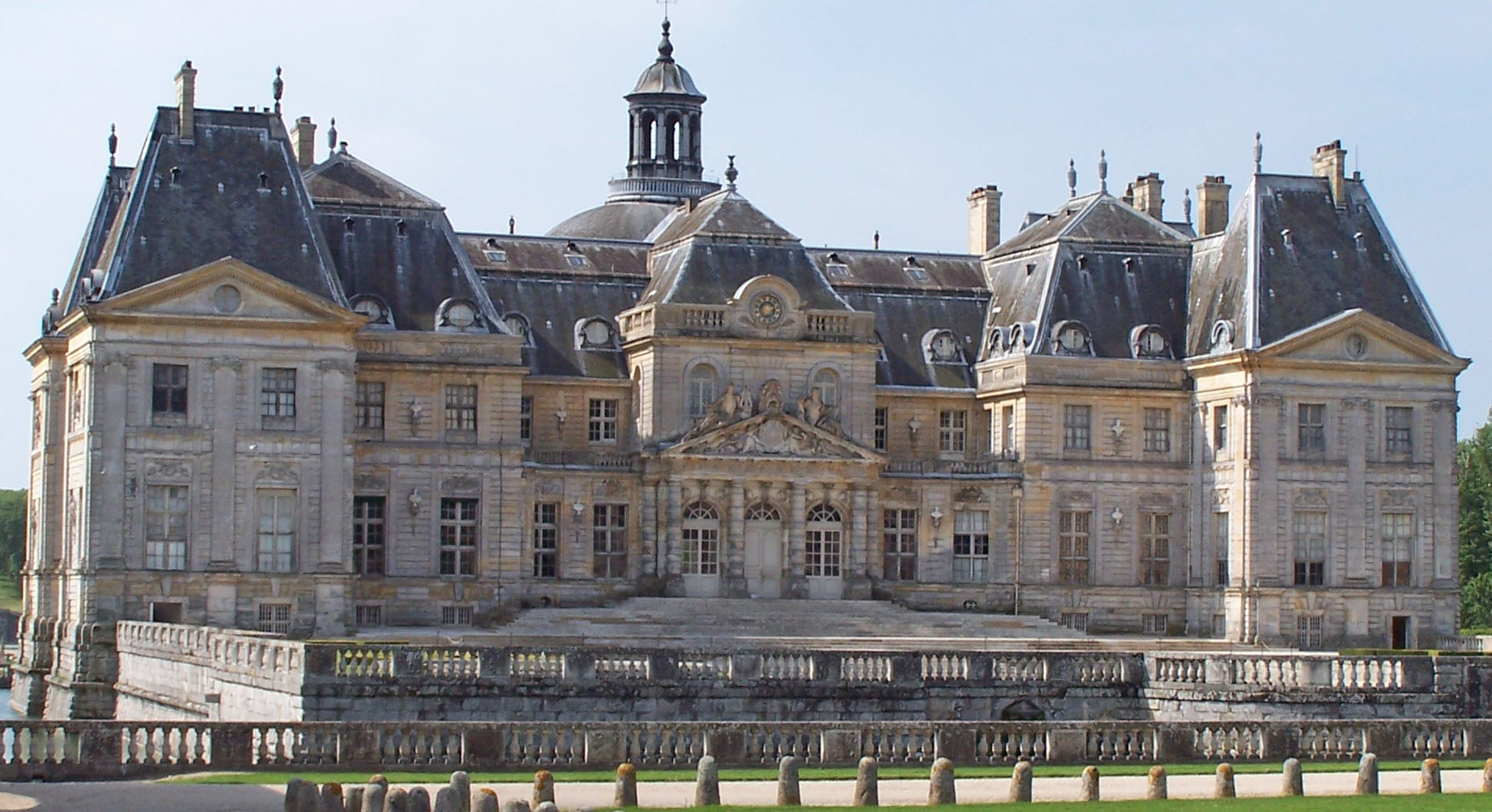
View of the entrance front

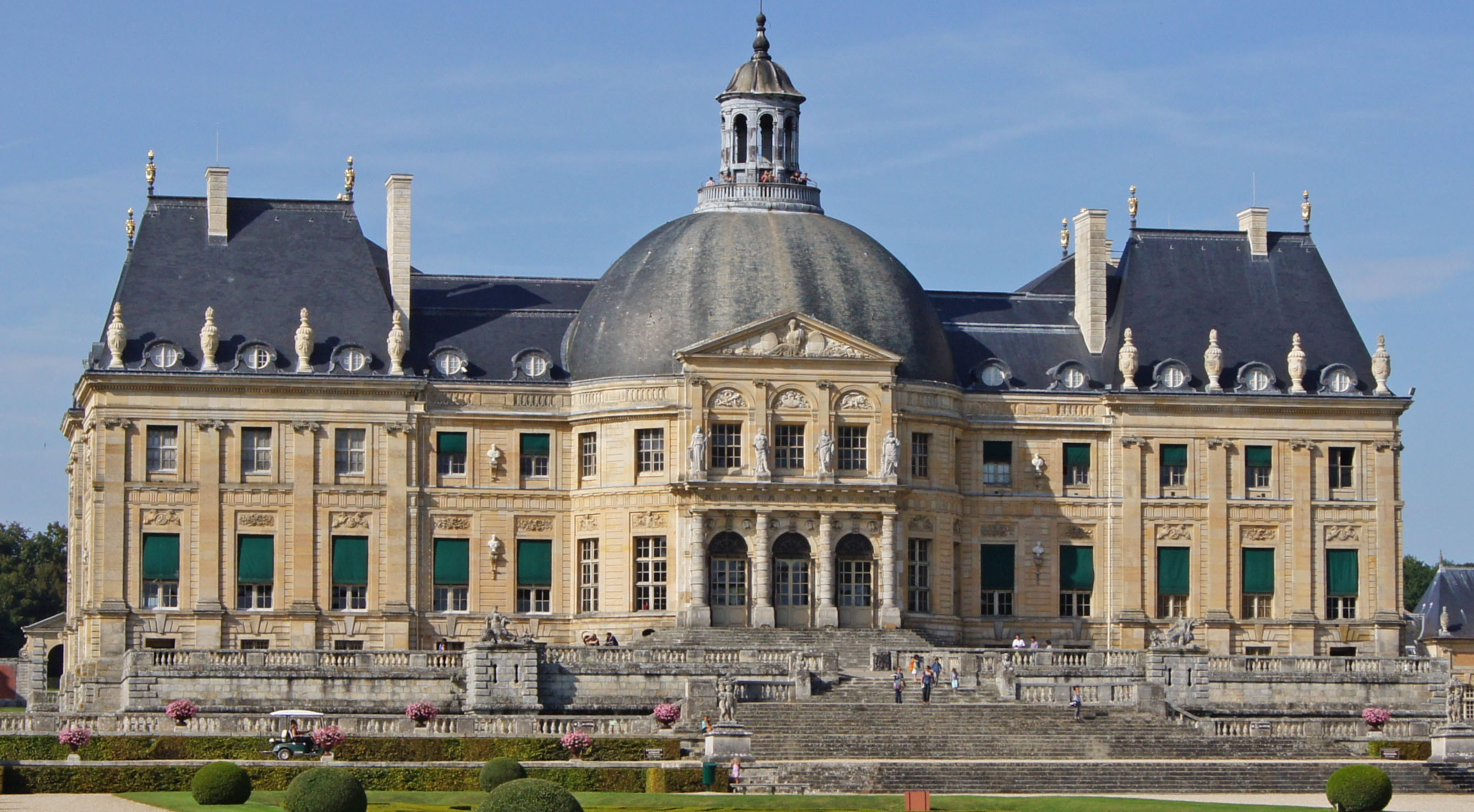
View of the garden front

The entrance front of the main château is characteristically French, with the two lateral pavilions flanking a central avant-corps, again reminiscent of Mansart's work at Maisons. Le Vau supplements these with two additional receding volumes between the pavilions and the central mass. All of these elements are further emphasized with steep pyramidal caps. Such steep roofs were inherited from medieval times and, like brick, were rapidly going out of fashion. Le Vau would never use them again. The overall effect at Vaux, according to Andrew Ayers, is "somewhat disparate and disorderly". Moreover, as David Hanser points out, Le Vau's elevation violates several rules of pure classical architecture. One of the most egregious is the use of two, rather than three, bays in the lateral pavilions, resulting in the uncomfortable placement of the pediments directly over the central pilaster. Ayers does concede however that, "although rather ungainly, the entrance facade at Vaux is nonetheless picturesque, in spite, or perhaps because, of its idiosyncrasies."

The garden front of the main château is considered more successful. The enormous, double-height Grand Salon that substantially protrudes from the corps de logis clearly dominates the southern elevation. The salon is covered by a huge slate dome surmounted with an imposing lantern and is fronted with a two-storey portico that is almost identical to one at the Hôtel Tambonneau. The use of a central oval salon is an innovation adopted by Le Vau from Italy. Although he himself had never been there, he undoubtedly knew from drawings and engravings of examples in buildings, such as the Palazzo Barberini in Rome, and had already used one to great effect at his Château du Raincy. At Le Raincy the salon spans the corps de logis and projects on both sides, but at Vaux, because of the double row of rooms, it is preceded by the vestibule on the entrance side, "thus delaying and dramatizing the visitor's discovery of this, the centrepiece of the house." The lateral pavilions of the garden facade project only slightly but are three bays wide with traditional tall slate roofs like those on the entrance front, effectively balancing the central domed salon.

=== Gardens ===
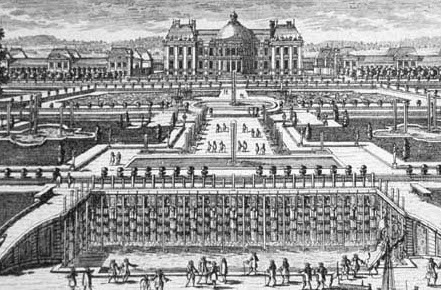
17th-century engraving of the parterres as first laid out

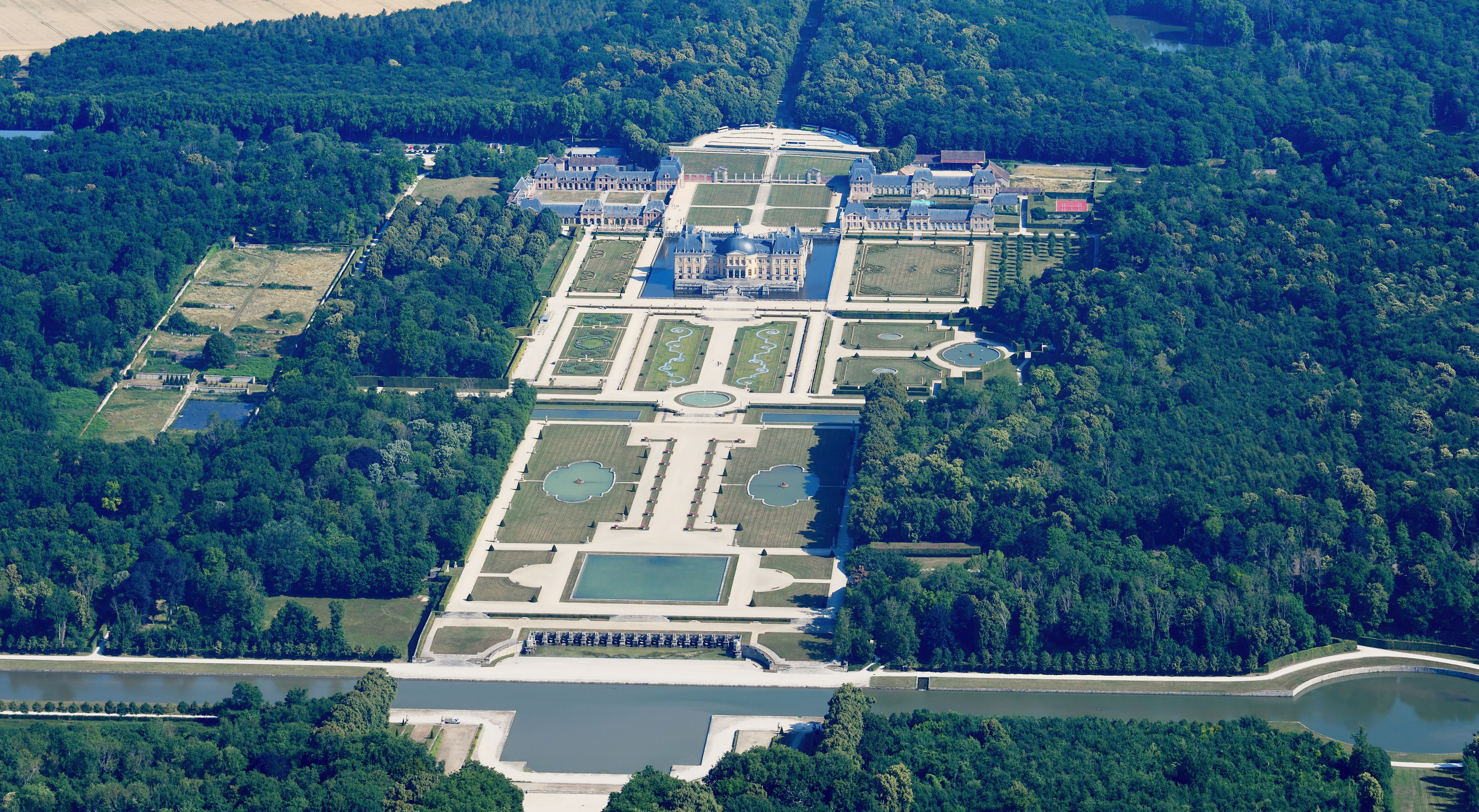
Aerial view of Vaux-le-Vicomte and its gardens

The château rises on an elevated platform in the middle of the woods and marks the border between unequal spaces, each treated in a different way. This effect is more distinctive today, as the woodlands are more mature, than it was in the seventeenth century when the site had been farmland, and the plantations were new.

Le Nôtre's garden was the dominant structure of the great complex, stretching nearly a mile and a half (3 km), with a balanced composition of water basins and canals contained in stone curbs, fountains, gravel walks, and patterned parterres that remains more coherent than the vast display Le Nôtre was to create at Versailles.

The site was naturally well-watered, with two small rivers that met in the park; the canalized bed of one forms the Grand Canal, which leads to a square basin.

Le Nôtre created a magnificent scene to be viewed from the house, using the laws of perspective. Le Nôtre used the natural terrain to his advantage. He placed the canal at the lowest part of the complex, thus hiding it from the main perspectival point of view. Past the canal, the garden ascends a large open lawn and ends with the Hercules column added in the 19th century. Shrubberies provided a picture frame to the garden that also served as a stage for royal fêtes.

Although the gardens retain Le Nôtre's original seventeenth-century design, much of their present sculptural decoration was created or reassembled during the restoration campaigns undertaken between 1875 and the early 1920s.

=== Anamorphosis abscondita in the garden ===
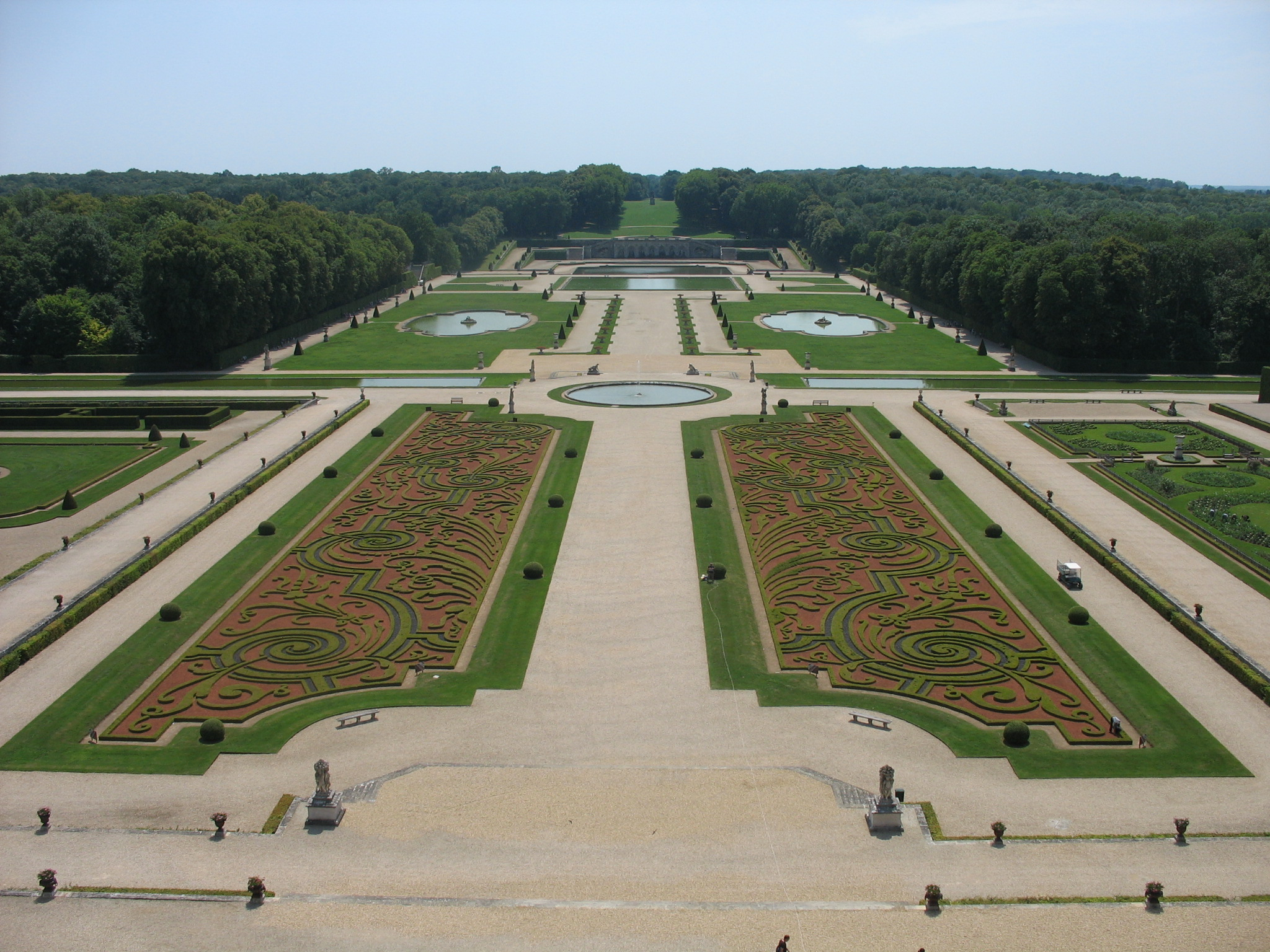
View of the gardens

Le Nôtre employed an optical illusion called anamorphosis abscondita (roughly translated as 'hidden distortion') in his garden design in order to establish decelerated perspective. The most apparent change in this manner is of the reflecting pools. They are narrower at the closest point to the viewer (standing at the rear of the château) than at their farthest point; this makes them appear closer to the viewer. From a certain designed viewing point, the distortion designed into the landscape elements produces a particular forced perspective and the eye perceives the elements to be closer than they actually are. That point, for Vaux-le-Vicomte, is at the top of the stairs at the rear of the château. Standing atop the grand staircase, one begins to experience the garden with a magnificent perspectival view. The anamorphosis abscondita creates visual effects, which are not encountered in nature, making the spectacle of gardens designed in this way extremely unusual to the viewer (who experiences a tension between the natural perspective cues in his peripheral vision and the forced perspective of the formal garden). The perspective effects are not readily apparent in photographs, either, making viewing the gardens in person the only way of truly experiencing them.

From the top of the grand staircase, this gives the impression that the entire garden is revealed in one single glance. Initially, the view consists of symmetrical rows of shrubbery, avenues, fountains, statues, flowers and other pieces developed to imitate nature; the elements exemplify the Baroque desire to mold nature to fit its wishes, thus using nature to imitate nature. The centrepiece is a large reflecting pool flanked by grottos holding statues in their many niches. The grand sloping lawn is not visible until one begins to explore the garden, when the viewer is made aware of the optical elements involved and discovers that the garden is much larger than it looks. Next, a circular pool, previously seen as ovular due to foreshortening, is passed and a canal that bisects the site is revealed, as well as a lower level path. As the viewer continues on, the second pool shows itself to be square and the grottos and their niched statues become clearer. However, when one walks towards the grottos, the relationship between the pool and the grottos appears awry. The grottos are actually on a much lower level than the rest of the garden and separated by a wide canal that is over half a mile (almost a kilometre) long. According to Allen Weiss, in Mirrors of Infinity, this optical effect is a result of the use of the tenth theorem of Euclid's Optics, which asserts that "the most distant parts of planes situated below the eye appear to be the most elevated".

In Fouquet's time, interested parties could cross the canal in a boat, but walking around the canal provides a view of the woods that mark what is no longer the garden and shows the distortion of the grottos previously seen as sculptural. Once the canal and grottos have been passed, the large sloping lawn is reached and the garden is viewed from the initial viewpoint's vanishing point, thus completing the circuit as intended by Le Nôtre. From this point, the distortions create the illusion that the gardens are much longer than they actually are. The many discoveries made as one travels through the dynamic garden contrast with the static view of the garden from the château.

== Use in film, television and popular culture ==
The château buildings and grounds have been used in at least 13 productions, or 70, according to the owners. For example, the property was used as the California home of the main villain Hugo Drax in the 1979 James Bond film Moonraker. It can also be seen in the background in the 1998 film The Man in the Iron Mask. In addition, the château appeared in several episodes of The Revolution, which is a documentary television series about the American Revolutionary War that was broadcast by History Channel in 2006. Australia's Next Top Model had a fashion shoot at the château for its 7th Cycle (episode 2), televised in August 2011. A confused retelling of the Vaux-le-Vicomte story was given by character Little Carmine Lupertazzi in season 4 of HBO's The Sopranos. More recently, it featured as the Palace of Versailles for BBC/Canal+ production of the TV drama series Versailles.

The château is one of the settings of Alexandre Dumas' novel The Vicomte of Bragelonne: Ten Years Later.

A 30 million pound wedding was held at the château in 2004. Vanisha Mittal, daughter of British-Indian steel industrialist billionaire Lakshmi Mittal, married Amit Bhatia, a British-Indian economist and businessman, at the château following their engagement ceremony at the Palace of Versailles. Kylie Minogue was paid $330,000 to sing at the wedding and the ceremony was followed by fireworks launched from the Eiffel Tower. According to a report in India Today,"over 35 craftsmen were flown in from Mumbai to erect a mandap on a pond in the sprawling gardens of the estate. Elephants made of fiberglass, minarets and a huge reception hall done up in pink were also put up. A lotus was designed in the pond and petals of all colour and shape scattered over it."

The château is the setting of Victoria's Secret first short film, Victoria’s Secret Holiday 2016: A Very Private Affair.

== See also ==
- List of Baroque residences
- 17th-century Western domes
- List of tourist attractions in Paris
