= Arrondissement of Melun =

Coordinates: 48°32′26″N 2°39′34″E

Melun
- Arrondissement
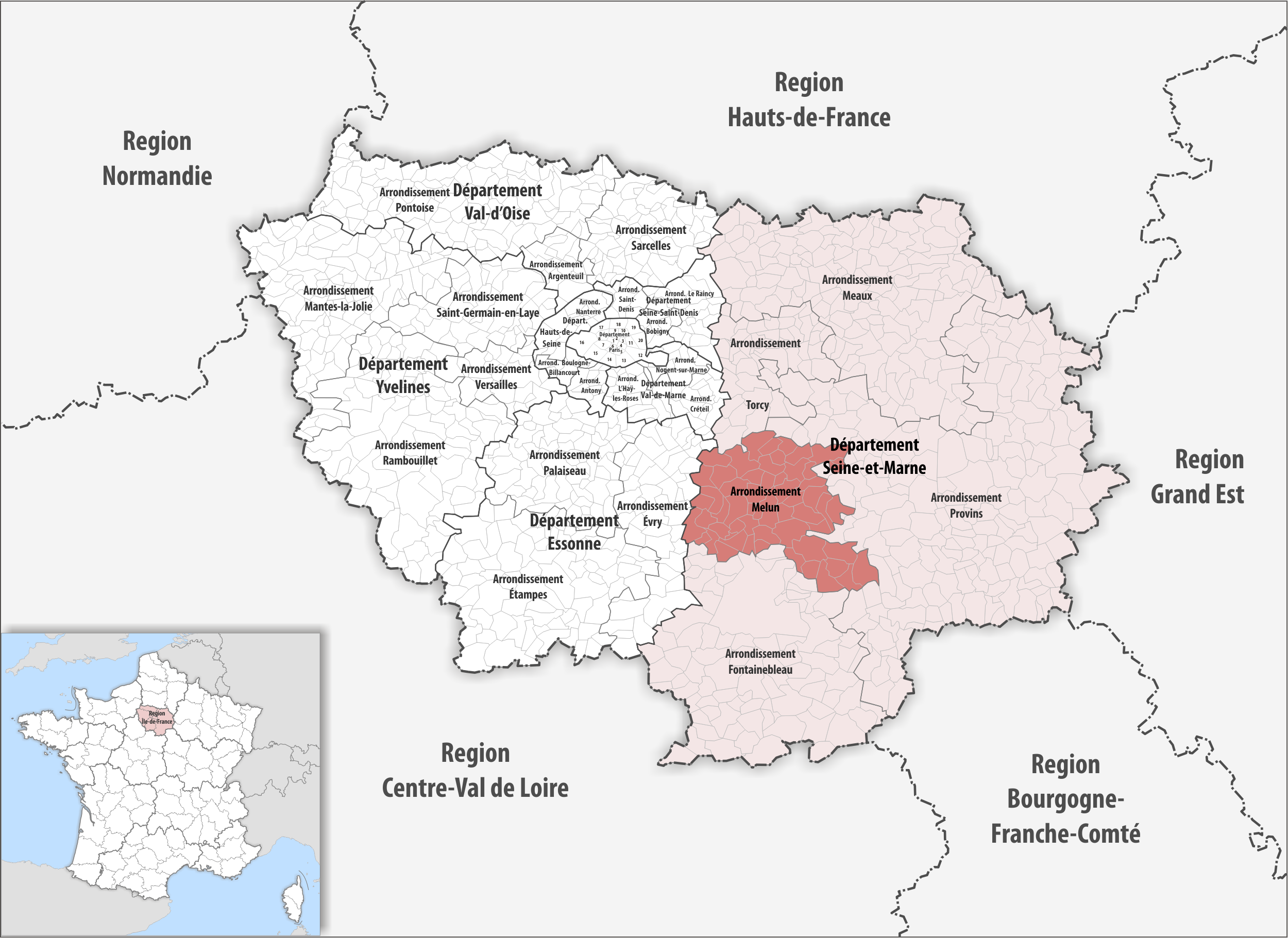
- Location within the region Île-de-France
- Country: France
- Region: Île-de-France
- Department: Seine-et-Marne
- No. of communes: {{{nbcomm}}}
- Area: 617.1 km^{2} (238.3 sq mi)
- Population (2023): 299,720
  - Density: 485.7/km^{2} (1,258/sq mi)
- INSEE code: 772

The arrondissement of Melun is an arrondissement of France in the Seine-et-Marne department in the Île-de-France region. It has 59 communes. Its population is 289,693 (2021), and its area is 617.1 km^{2} (238.3 sq mi).

== Composition ==
The communes of the arrondissement of Melun, and their INSEE codes, are:

1. Andrezel (77004)
2. Argentières (77007)
3. Beauvoir (77029)
4. Blandy (77034)
5. Boissettes (77038)
6. Boissise-la-Bertrand (77039)
7. Boissise-le-Roi (77040)
8. Bombon (77044)
9. Cesson (77067)
10. Champdeuil (77081)
11. Champeaux (77082)
12. Le Châtelet-en-Brie (77100)
13. Châtillon-la-Borde (77103)
14. Chaumes-en-Brie (77107)
15. Combs-la-Ville (77122)
16. Coubert (77127)
17. Courquetaine (77136)
18. Crisenoy (77145)
19. Dammarie-les-Lys (77152)
20. Échouboulains (77164)
21. Les Écrennes (77165)
22. Évry-Grégy-sur-Yerre (77175)
23. Féricy (77179)
24. Fontaine-le-Port (77188)
25. Fouju (77195)
26. Grisy-Suisnes (77217)
27. Guignes (77222)
28. Lieusaint (77251)
29. Limoges-Fourches (77252)
30. Lissy (77253)
31. Livry-sur-Seine (77255)
32. Machault (77266)
33. Maincy (77269)
34. Le Mée-sur-Seine (77285)
35. Melun (77288)
36. Moisenay (77295)
37. Moissy-Cramayel (77296)
38. Montereau-sur-le-Jard (77306)
39. Nandy (77326)
40. Ozouer-le-Voulgis (77352)
41. Pamfou (77354)
42. Pringy (77378)
43. Réau (77384)
44. La Rochette (77389)
45. Rubelles (77394)
46. Saint-Fargeau-Ponthierry (77407)
47. Saint-Germain-Laxis (77410)
48. Saint-Méry (77426)
49. Savigny-le-Temple (77445)
50. Seine-Port (77447)
51. Sivry-Courtry (77453)
52. Soignolles-en-Brie (77455)
53. Solers (77457)
54. Valence-en-Brie (77480)
55. Vaux-le-Pénil (77487)
56. Vert-Saint-Denis (77495)
57. Villiers-en-Bière (77518)
58. Voisenon (77528)
59. Yèbles (77534)

== History ==
The arrondissement of Melun was created in 1800. In 1993 it lost the two cantons of Roissy-en-Brie and Pontault-Combault to the new arrondissement of Noisiel (since 1994 Torcy). In 2006 it lost the canton of Rozay-en-Brie to the arrondissement of Provins. At the January 2017 reorganisation of the arrondissements of Seine-et-Marne, it lost 10 communes to the arrondissement of Fontainebleau, 15 communes to the arrondissement of Provins and seven communes to the arrondissement of Torcy.

As a result of the reorganisation of the cantons of France which came into effect in 2015, the borders of the cantons are no longer related to the borders of the arrondissements. The cantons of the arrondissement of Melun were, as of January 2015:

1. Brie-Comte-Robert
2. Le Châtelet-en-Brie
3. Combs-la-Ville
4. Le Mée-sur-Seine
5. Melun-Nord
6. Melun-Sud
7. Mormant
8. Perthes
9. Savigny-le-Temple
10. Tournan-en-Brie
