= Saint-Germain-Laxis =

- Commune
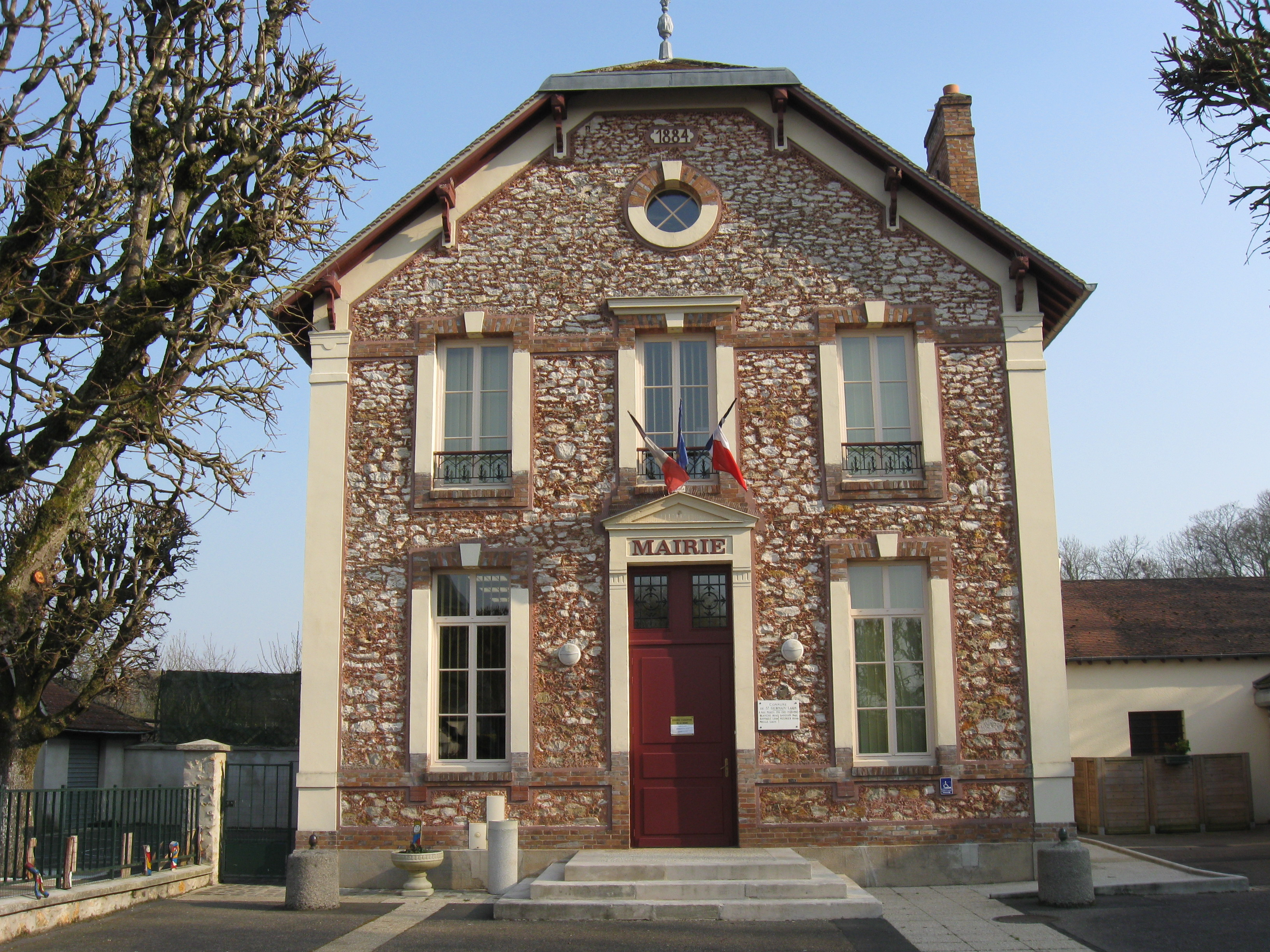
- The town hall in Saint-Germain-Laxis
- Location of Saint-Germain-Laxis
- Location within France Location within Île-de-France (region)
- Coordinates: 48°34′54″N 2°42′44″E
- Country: France
- Region: Île-de-France
- Department: Seine-et-Marne
- Arrondissement: Melun
- Canton: Melun
- Intercommunality: CA Melun Val de Seine

Government
  - Mayor (2020–2026): Willy Delporte
- Area^{1}: 7.18 km^{2} (2.77 sq mi)
- Highest elevation: 92 m (302 ft)
- Lowest elevation: 73 m (240 ft)
- Population (2023): 742
  - Density: 103/km^{2} (268/sq mi)
- Demonym: Saint-Germinois
- Time zone: UTC+01:00 (CET)
  - Summer (DST): UTC+02:00 (CEST)
- INSEE/Postal code: 77410 /77950
- ^{1} French Land Register data, which excludes lakes, ponds, glaciers > 1 km^{2} (0.386 sq mi or 247 acres) and river estuaries.

Saint-Germain-Laxis (French pronunciation: [sɛ̃ ʒɛʁmɛ̃ laksi]) is a commune in the Seine-et-Marne department, Île-de-France, north central France.

== Demographics ==
Inhabitants of Saint-Germain-Laxis are called Saint-Germinois.

== See also ==
- Communes of the Seine-et-Marne department
