= Rubelles =

- Commune
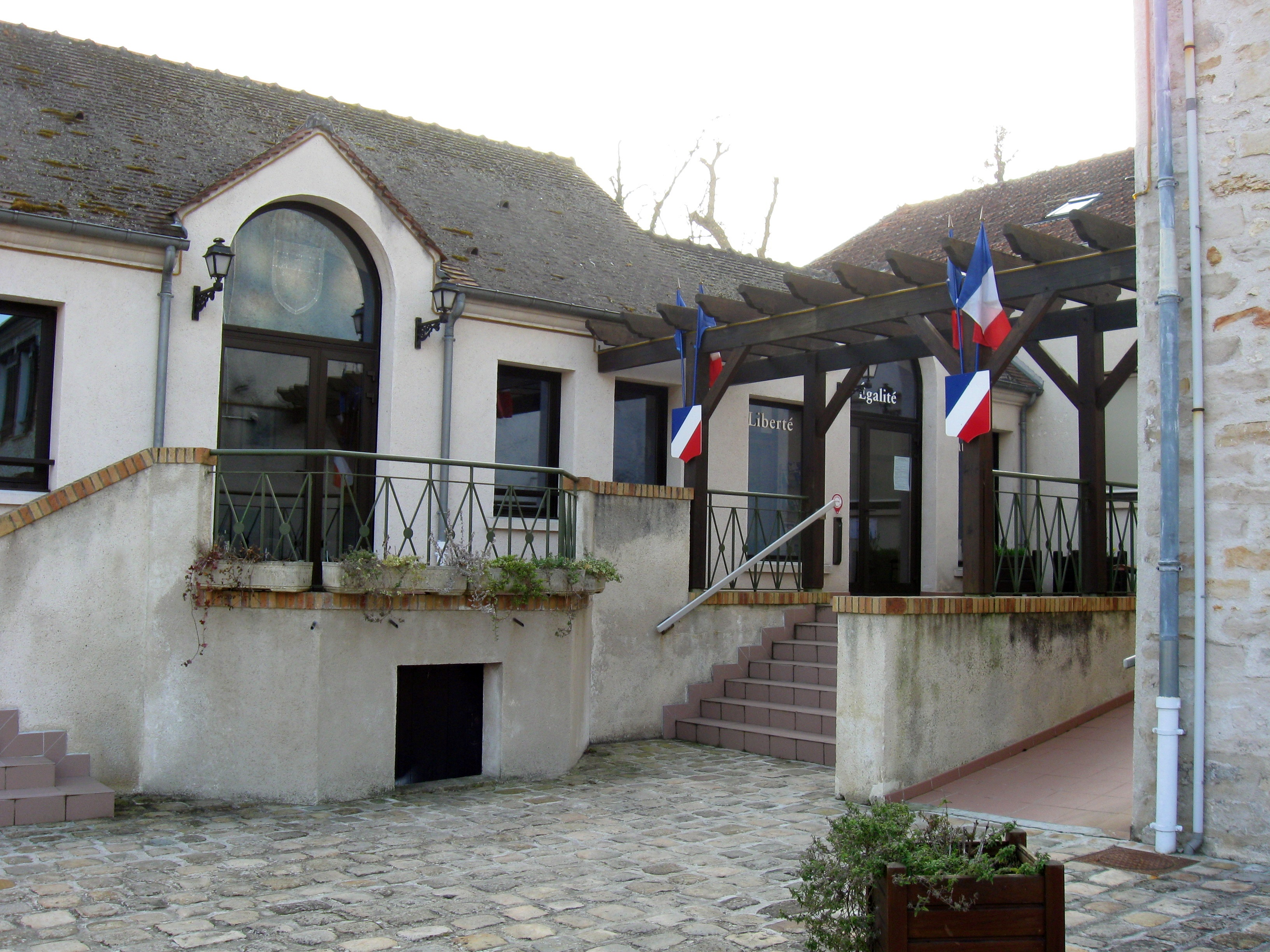
- The town hall in Rubelles
- Location of Rubelles
- Location within France Location within Île-de-France (region)
- Coordinates: 48°33′32″N 2°40′47″E
- Country: France
- Region: Île-de-France
- Department: Seine-et-Marne
- Arrondissement: Melun
- Canton: Melun
- Intercommunality: CA Melun Val de Seine

Government
  - Mayor (2020–2026): Françoise Lefebvre
- Area^{1}: 3.91 km^{2} (1.51 sq mi)
- Highest elevation: 84 m (276 ft)
- Lowest elevation: 48 m (157 ft)
- Population (2023): 3,537
  - Density: 905/km^{2} (2,340/sq mi)
- Time zone: UTC+01:00 (CET)
  - Summer (DST): UTC+02:00 (CEST)
- INSEE/Postal code: 77394 /77950
- ^{1} French Land Register data, which excludes lakes, ponds, glaciers > 1 km^{2} (0.386 sq mi or 247 acres) and river estuaries.

Rubelles (French pronunciation: [ʁybɛl]) is a commune in the Seine-et-Marne department in the Île-de-France region in north-central France.

== Population ==
Historical population
Year	Pop.	±% p.a.
1968	451	—
1975	742	+7.37%
1982	1,822	+13.69%
1990	1,753	−0.48%
1999	1,653	−0.65%
2007	1,830	+1.28%
2012	1,989	+1.68%
2017	2,355	+3.44%
2023	3,537	+7.01%
Source: INSEE

Inhabitants of Rubelles are called Rubellois in French.

== See also ==
- Communes of the Seine-et-Marne department
