= La Rochette, Seine-et-Marne =

La Rochette
- Commune
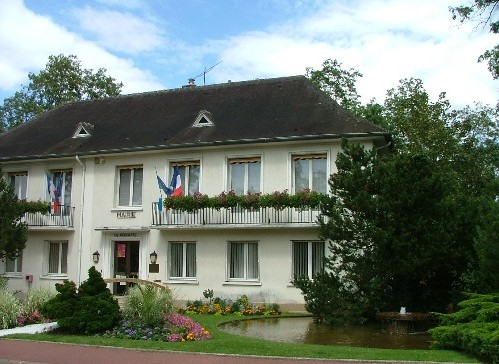
- Town hall

- Coat of arms
- Location of La Rochette
- Location within France Location within Île-de-France (region)
- Coordinates: 48°30′00″N 2°40′00″E
- Country: France
- Region: Île-de-France
- Department: Seine-et-Marne
- Arrondissement: Melun
- Canton: Melun
- Intercommunality: CA Melun Val de Seine

Government
  - Mayor (2020–2026): Pierre Yvroud
- Area^{1}: 5.85 km^{2} (2.26 sq mi)
- Highest elevation: 98 m (322 ft)
- Lowest elevation: 36 m (118 ft)
- Population (2023): 3,932
  - Density: 672/km^{2} (1,740/sq mi)
- Time zone: UTC+01:00 (CET)
  - Summer (DST): UTC+02:00 (CEST)
- INSEE/Postal code: 77389 /77000
- ^{1} French Land Register data, which excludes lakes, ponds, glaciers > 1 km^{2} (0.386 sq mi or 247 acres) and river estuaries.

La Rochette is a commune in the Seine-et-Marne department in the Île-de-France region in north-central France. It a small, particularly affluent community bordering the Seine river to the east and the historical Fontainebleau forest to the south.

== History ==
The oldest documentation known concerning La Rochette dates back to 1047.

== Notable sites ==
The commune has many villas along the Seine as well as many estates and points of interest. In the centre of the village, the Maison Raulin (former estate of Gustave Raulin, architect for the City of Paris) stands out as a particularly tall structure. Nearby, the oldest building of the commune, l'Eglise Notre-Dame de la Visitation (dating back to the 13th century), can be found.

Across the church is the estate of Le Rocheton. Le Rocheton has had a number of different purposes. In the 19th century, the estate belonged to the Rochefoucauld family until being purchased in 1816 by Saint-Joseph de Lyon nuns. Their prime mission was to offer education and health care to children. In 1946, the estate was acquired by the YMCA. Because of its close proximity to Paris, the American army and the YMCA had used Le Rocheton as a halfway house during World War II. American soldiers who had been taken captive by the German army stayed at Le Rocheton before returning to America. In the 1950s, the centre began to accommodate asylum seekers from all over the world. It is still owned by the YMCA. Its primary purpose is a hotel for tourists, families and groups. Educational and professional training programmes are also offered.

== Sports ==
The village has an equestrian centre as well as an indoor/outdoor tennis club. Le Rocheton YMCA also offers a number of activities such as mountain biking and basketball.

== Population ==
Historical population
Year	Pop.	±% p.a.
1968	2,871	—
1975	3,096	+1.08%
1982	2,992	−0.49%
1990	2,861	−0.56%
1999	2,759	−0.40%
2007	2,966	+0.91%
2012	3,119	+1.01%
2017	3,412	+1.81%
2023	3,932	+2.39%
Source: INSEE

The inhabitants are called Rochettois in French. Residents of the commune tend to be higher income families and individuals.

== See also ==
- Communes of the Seine-et-Marne department
