= Canton of Melun =

Coordinates: 48.5333°N 2.6667°E

Melun
- Canton
- Country: France
- Region: Île-de-France
- Department: Seine-et-Marne
- No. of communes: {{{nbcomm}}}
- Area: 66.43 km^{2} (25.65 sq mi)
- Population (2023): 71,403
  - Density: 1,075/km^{2} (2,784/sq mi)
- INSEE code: 77 11

The canton of Melun is a French administrative division, located in the arrondissement of Melun, in the Seine-et-Marne département (Île-de-France région).

== Composition ==
The canton consists of the following communes:

- Livry-sur-Seine
- Maincy
- Melun
- Montereau-sur-le-Jard
- La Rochette
- Rubelles
- Saint-Germain-Laxis
- Vaux-le-Pénil
- Voisenon

== See also ==
- Cantons of the Seine-et-Marne department
- Communes of the Seine-et-Marne department
