= Montereau-sur-le-Jard =

- Commune
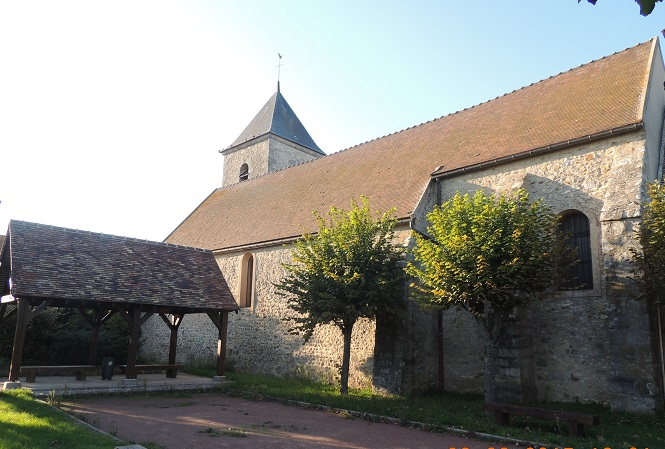
- The church in Montereau-sur-le-Jard
- Location of Montereau-sur-le-Jard
- Location within France Location within Île-de-France (region)
- Coordinates: 48°35′24″N 2°40′03″E
- Country: France
- Region: Île-de-France
- Department: Seine-et-Marne
- Arrondissement: Melun
- Canton: Melun
- Intercommunality: CA Melun Val de Seine

Government
  - Mayor (2020–2026): Christian Hus
- Area^{1}: 11.29 km^{2} (4.36 sq mi)
- Highest elevation: 98 m (322 ft)
- Lowest elevation: 79 m (259 ft)
- Population (2023): 499
  - Density: 44.2/km^{2} (114/sq mi)
- Time zone: UTC+01:00 (CET)
  - Summer (DST): UTC+02:00 (CEST)
- INSEE/Postal code: 77306 /77950
- ^{1} French Land Register data, which excludes lakes, ponds, glaciers > 1 km^{2} (0.386 sq mi or 247 acres) and river estuaries.

Montereau-sur-le-Jard (French pronunciation: [mɔ̃tʁo syʁ lə ʒaʁ]) is a commune in the Seine-et-Marne department in the Île-de-France region in north-central France.

== Demographics ==
Inhabitants are called Monjarciens.

== See also ==
- Communes of the Seine-et-Marne department
