= Vaux-le-Pénil =

- Commune
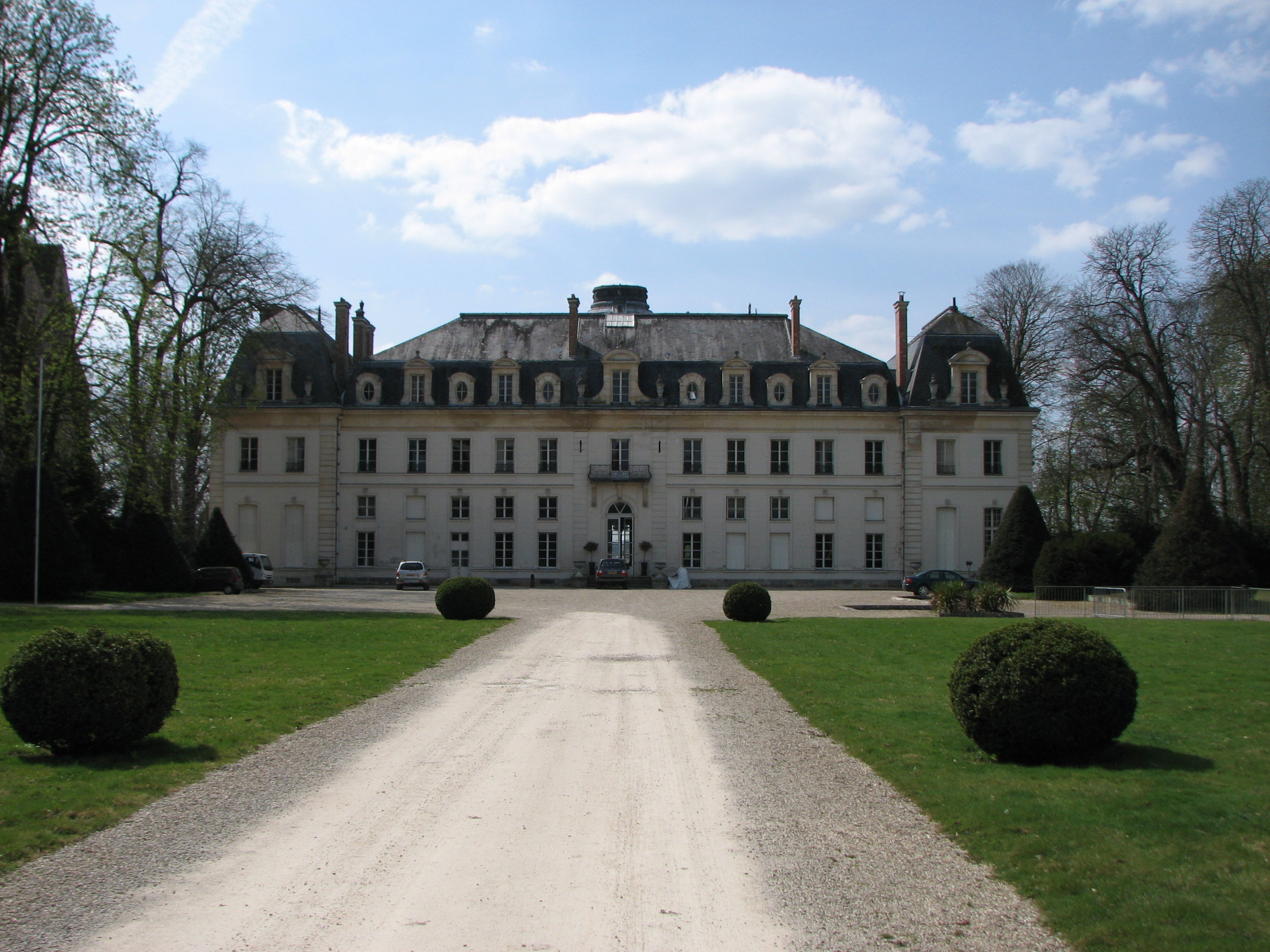
- Castle of Vaux-le-Pénil

- Coat of arms
- Location of Vaux-le-Pénil
- Location within France Location within Île-de-France (region)
- Coordinates: 48°31′33″N 2°40′57″E
- Country: France
- Region: Île-de-France
- Department: Seine-et-Marne
- Arrondissement: Melun
- Canton: Melun
- Intercommunality: CA Melun Val de Seine

Government
  - Mayor (2020–2026): Henri de Meyrignac (DVG)
- Area^{1}: 11.64 km^{2} (4.49 sq mi)
- Highest elevation: 96 m (315 ft)
- Lowest elevation: 37 m (121 ft)
- Population (2023): 11,474
  - Density: 985.7/km^{2} (2,553/sq mi)
- Time zone: UTC+01:00 (CET)
  - Summer (DST): UTC+02:00 (CEST)
- INSEE/Postal code: 77487 /77000
- ^{1} French Land Register data, which excludes lakes, ponds, glaciers > 1 km^{2} (0.386 sq mi or 247 acres) and river estuaries.

Vaux-le-Pénil (French pronunciation: [vo lə penil]) is a commune in the Seine-et-Marne department in the Île-de-France region in north-central France.

== Demographics ==
Inhabitants of Vaux-le-Pénil are called Penivauxois in French.

Historical population
Year	Pop.	±% p.a.
1968	2,506	—
1975	4,405	+8.39%
1982	6,960	+6.75%
1990	8,143	+1.98%
1999	10,688	+3.07%
2007	11,377	+0.78%
2012	10,730	−1.16%
2017	11,062	+0.61%
2023	11,474	+0.61%
Source: INSEE

== Education ==
Public schools in the commune include :

- three preschools : Romain Rolland, Gaston Dumont and Jean-Robert Rouchon
- three elementary schools : Romain Rolland, Gaston Dumont and Beuve et Gantier
- one junior high school : La mare au Champs
- one high school/sixth form college : Simone Signoret

== See also ==
- Communes of the Seine-et-Marne department
