= Lissy (commune) =

- Commune
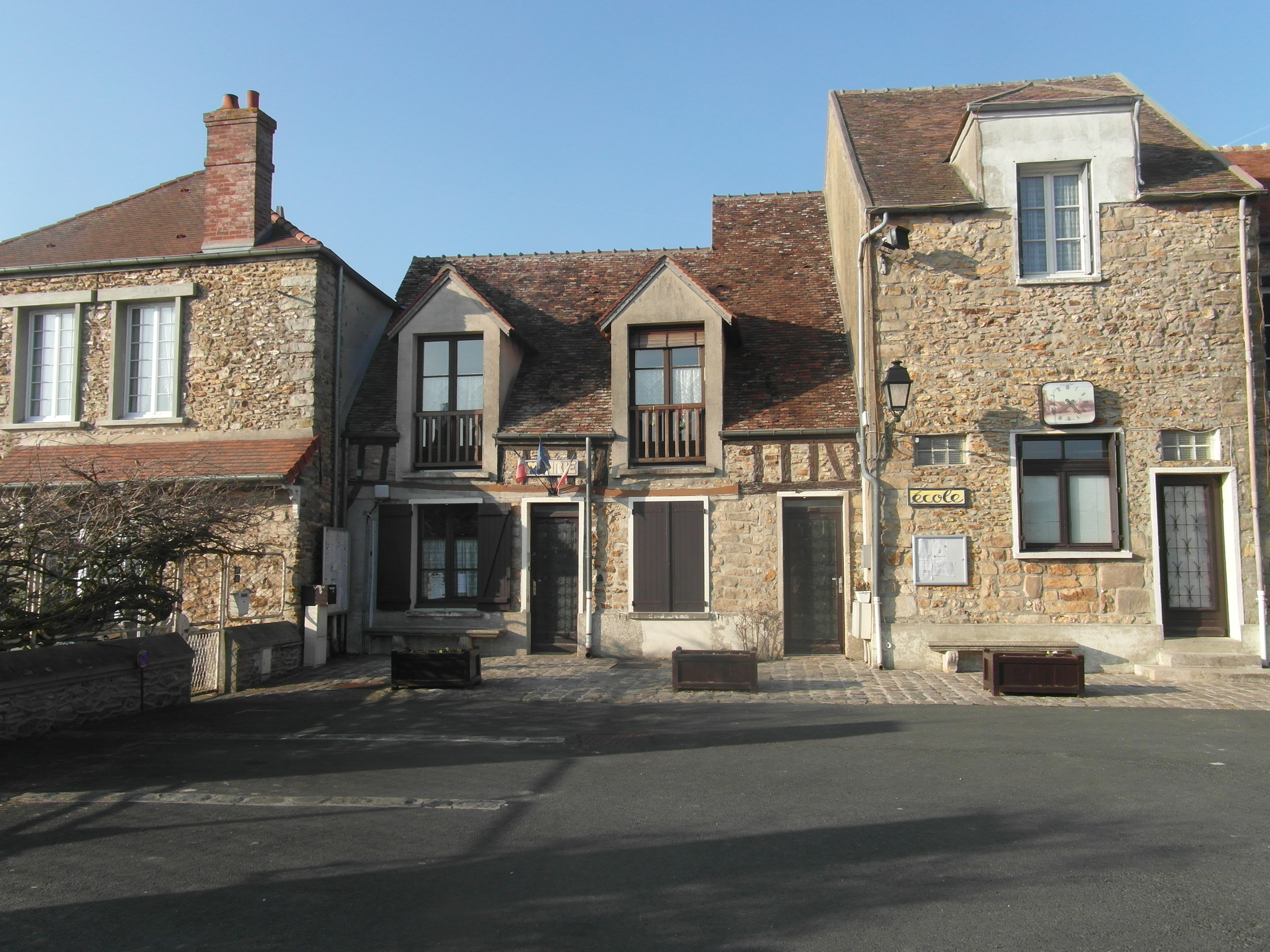
- The town hall in Lissy
- Location of Lissy
- Location within France Location within Île-de-France (region)
- Coordinates: 48°37′37″N 2°41′46″E
- Country: France
- Region: Île-de-France
- Department: Seine-et-Marne
- Arrondissement: Melun
- Canton: Fontenay-Trésigny
- Intercommunality: CA Melun Val de Seine

Government
  - Mayor (2020–2026): Jean-Claude Lecinse
- Area^{1}: 6.85 km^{2} (2.64 sq mi)
- Highest elevation: 97 m (318 ft)
- Lowest elevation: 87 m (285 ft)
- Population (2023): 352
  - Density: 51.4/km^{2} (133/sq mi)
- Time zone: UTC+01:00 (CET)
  - Summer (DST): UTC+02:00 (CEST)
- INSEE/Postal code: 77253 /77550
- ^{1} French Land Register data, which excludes lakes, ponds, glaciers > 1 km^{2} (0.386 sq mi or 247 acres) and river estuaries.

Lissy (French pronunciation: [lisi]) is a commune in the Seine-et-Marne department in the Île-de-France region in north-central France.

== See also ==
- Communes of the Seine-et-Marne department
