= Voisenon =

- Commune
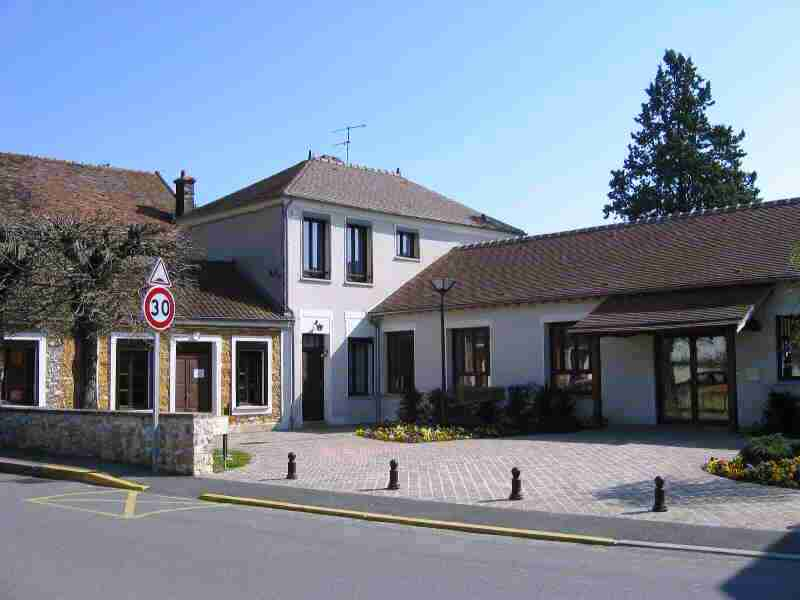
- The town hall in Voisenon
- Location of Voisenon
- Location within France Location within Île-de-France (region)
- Coordinates: 48°34′16″N 2°39′53″E
- Country: France
- Region: Île-de-France
- Department: Seine-et-Marne
- Arrondissement: Melun
- Canton: Melun
- Intercommunality: Melun Val de Seine

Government
  - Mayor (2020–2026): Julien Aguin
- Area^{1}: 3.36 km^{2} (1.30 sq mi)
- Highest elevation: 96 m (315 ft)
- Lowest elevation: 69 m (226 ft)
- Population (2023): 1,170
  - Density: 348/km^{2} (902/sq mi)
- Time zone: UTC+01:00 (CET)
  - Summer (DST): UTC+02:00 (CEST)
- INSEE/Postal code: 77528 /77950
- ^{1} French Land Register data, which excludes lakes, ponds, glaciers > 1 km^{2} (0.386 sq mi or 247 acres) and river estuaries.

Voisenon (French pronunciation: [vwaznɔ̃]) is a commune in the Seine-et-Marne department, in the Île-de-France region in north-central France.

A little village, located 39 kilometers south-east from the center of Paris, Voisenon was mainly known for its 12th century abbey, and then for its renowned local figure, Claude-Henri de Fusée de Voisenon, academician and abbot. Still dedicated to cereal growing, it now enjoys the advantages of its nearest city, Melun, while keeping a country-style atmosphere.

Inhabitants of Voisenon are called Voisenonais.

== History ==
=== Origins ===
The etymology is likely to indicate a Gaulish presence, but no evidence of this has been found yet.

=== Fief and earldom ===
The first mention of the place appears in the 12th century. During the Middle Ages, Voisenon was the Fusée family's fief and was attached to the crown lands of France.

=== The fall ===
The Fusée lost the estate in 1790 and 1791.

=== Contemporary ===
In 1949, the Château du Jard was given to the Association des paralysés de France, and used as a vocational school for persons with motor disability.

== Demographics ==
In 2007, a total of 1,108 inhabitants lived in Voisenon, according to the official census.

== Transport ==
The nearest railway station is Melun station, which is an interchange station on Paris RER line D, on the Transilien R suburban rail line, and on several national rail lines. It is located 27 kilometres from Paris-Orly Airport, and 50 kilometres from Paris-Charles de Gaulle Airport.

== See also ==
- Communes of the Seine-et-Marne department
