= Livry-sur-Seine =

- Commune
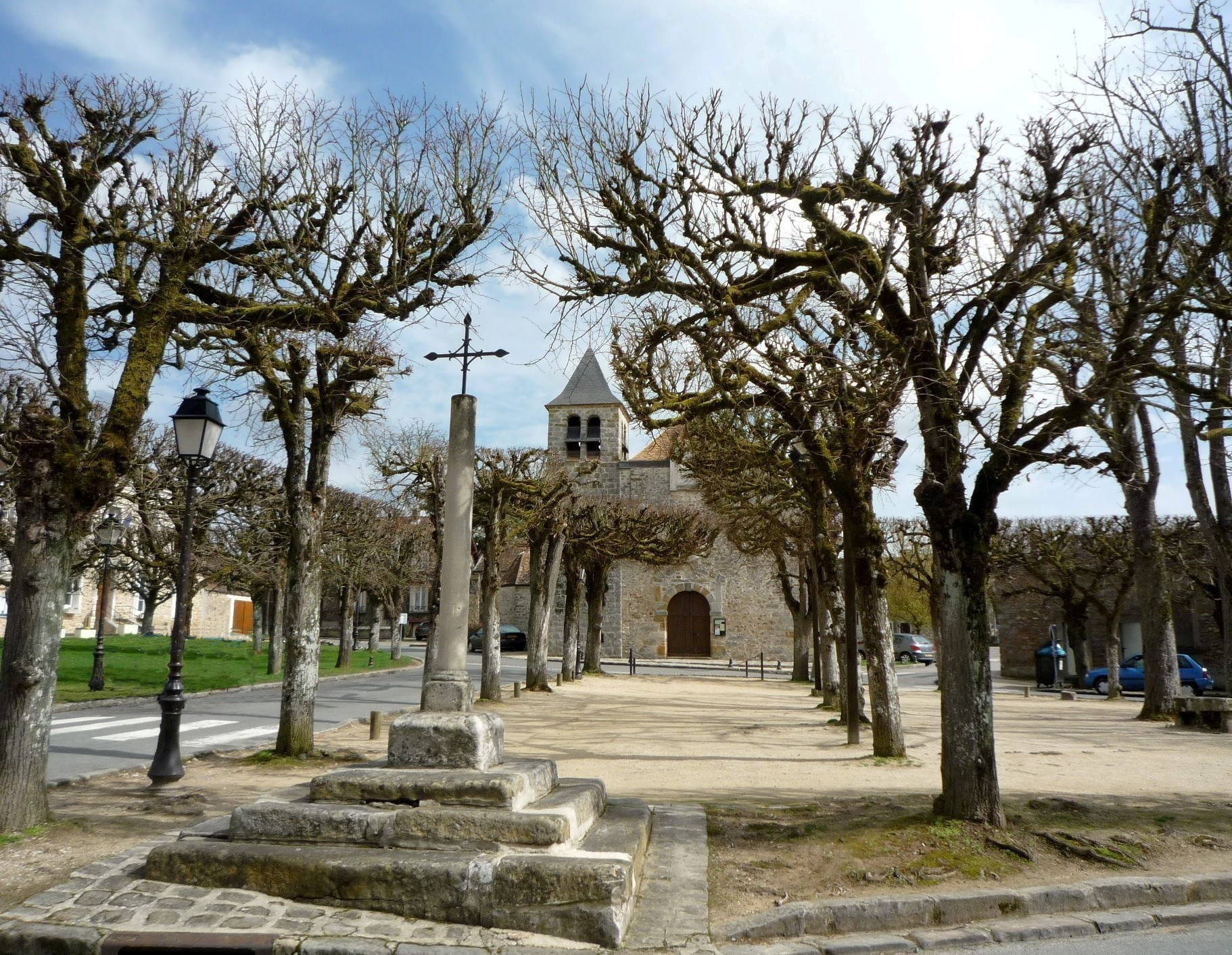
- The church in Livry-sur-Seine
- Location of Livry-sur-Seine
- Location within France Location within Île-de-France (region)
- Coordinates: 48°30′37″N 2°41′07″E
- Country: France
- Region: Île-de-France
- Department: Seine-et-Marne
- Arrondissement: Melun
- Canton: Melun
- Intercommunality: CA Melun Val de Seine

Government
  - Mayor (2020–2026): Régis Dagron
- Area^{1}: 4.97 km^{2} (1.92 sq mi)
- Highest elevation: 85 m (279 ft)
- Lowest elevation: 37 m (121 ft)
- Population (2023): 2,226
  - Density: 448/km^{2} (1,160/sq mi)
- Demonym: Livryens
- Time zone: UTC+01:00 (CET)
  - Summer (DST): UTC+02:00 (CEST)
- INSEE/Postal code: 77255 /77000
- Website: www.livry-sur-seine.fr
- ^{1} French Land Register data, which excludes lakes, ponds, glaciers > 1 km^{2} (0.386 sq mi or 247 acres) and river estuaries.

Livry-sur-Seine (French pronunciation: [livʁi syʁ sɛn]; lit. 'Livry-on-Seine') is a commune in the Seine-et-Marne department in the Île-de-France region in northern France.

== Population ==
Historical population
Year	Pop.	±% p.a.
1968	795	—
1975	1,231	+6.45%
1982	1,602	+3.83%
1990	1,847	+1.79%
1999	1,880	+0.20%
2007	1,898	+0.12%
2012	1,925	+0.28%
2017	2,076	+1.52%
2023	2,226	+1.17%
Source: INSEE

Inhabitants are called Livryens in French.

== See also ==
- Communes of the Seine-et-Marne department
