= Limoges-Fourches =

- Commune
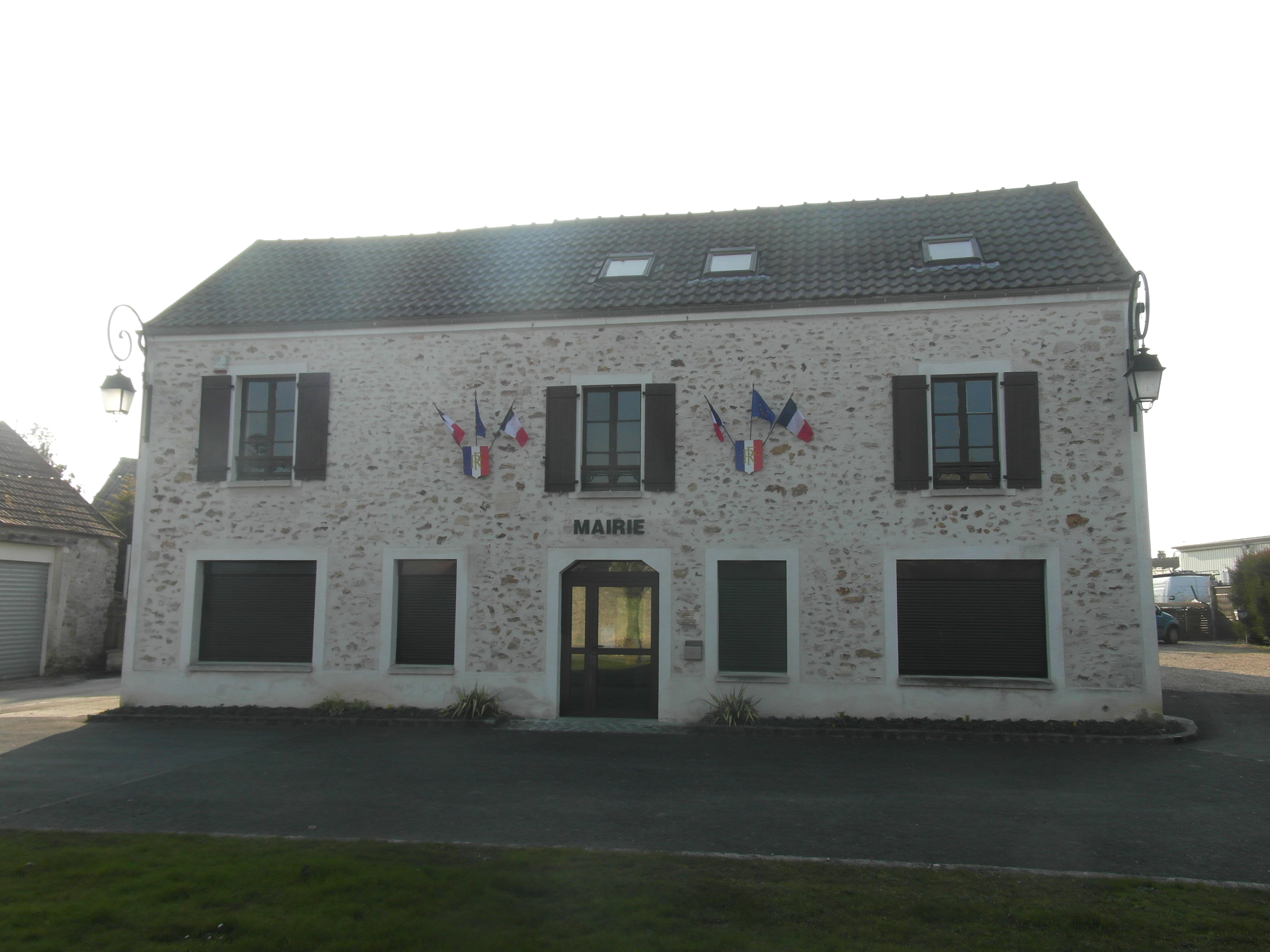
- The town hall in Limoges-Fourches
- Location of Limoges-Fourches
- Location within France Location within Île-de-France (region)
- Coordinates: 48°37′37″N 2°39′56″E
- Country: France
- Region: Île-de-France
- Department: Seine-et-Marne
- Arrondissement: Melun
- Canton: Fontenay-Trésigny
- Intercommunality: CA Melun Val de Seine

Government
  - Mayor (2020–2026): Philippe Charpentier
- Area^{1}: 7.96 km^{2} (3.07 sq mi)
- Highest elevation: 97 m (318 ft)
- Lowest elevation: 86 m (282 ft)
- Population (2023): 625
  - Density: 78.5/km^{2} (203/sq mi)
- Time zone: UTC+01:00 (CET)
  - Summer (DST): UTC+02:00 (CEST)
- INSEE/Postal code: 77252 /77550
- ^{1} French Land Register data, which excludes lakes, ponds, glaciers > 1 km^{2} (0.386 sq mi or 247 acres) and river estuaries.

Limoges-Fourches (French pronunciation: [limɔʒ fuʁʃ]) is a commune in the Seine-et-Marne department in the Île-de-France region, in north-central France. Its inhabitants are called limofurcaciens.

== See also ==
- Communes of the Seine-et-Marne department
