= Maincy =

- Commune
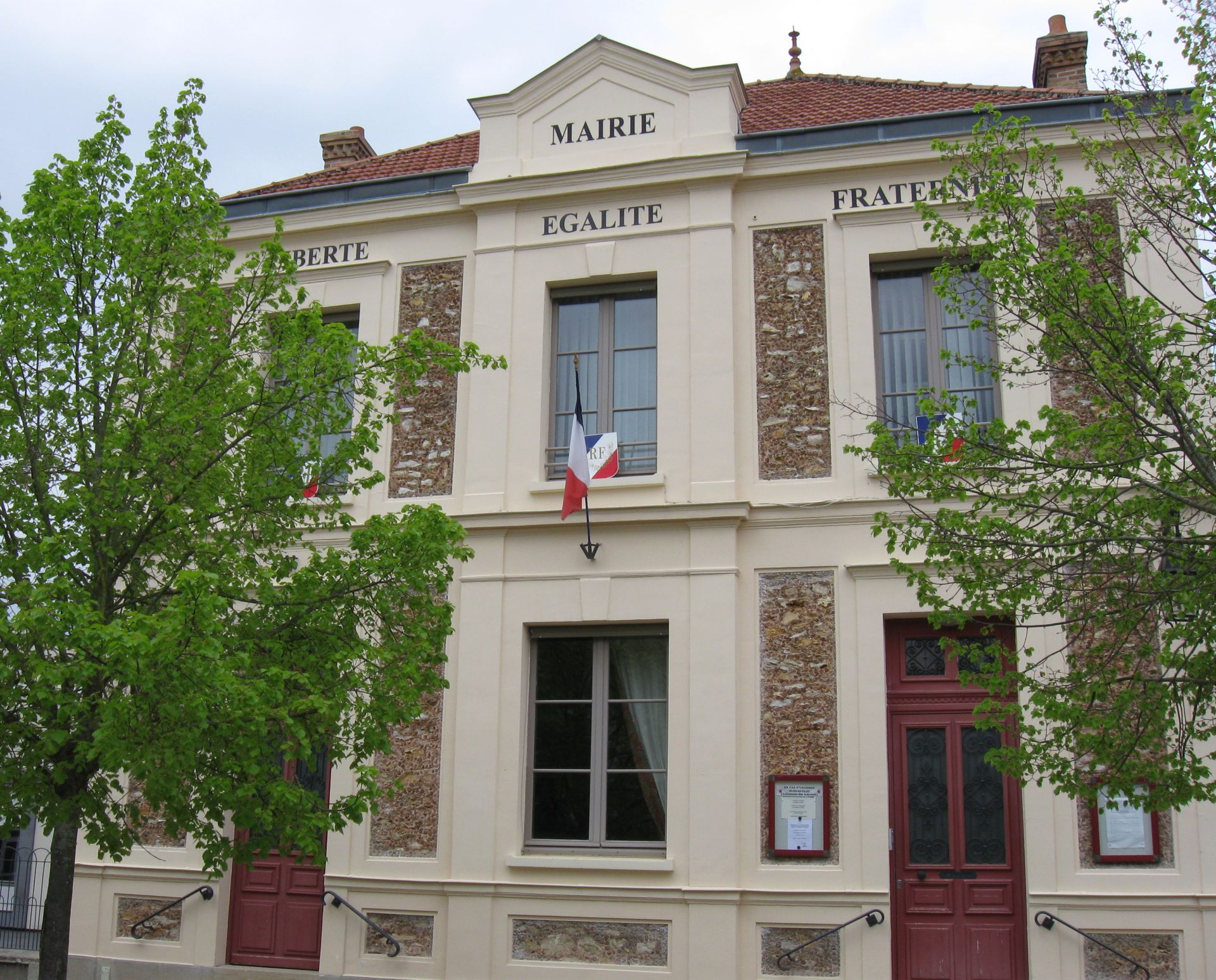
- The town hall in Maincy

- Coat of arms
- Location of Maincy
- Location within France Location within Île-de-France (region)
- Coordinates: 48°33′N 2°42′E
- Country: France
- Region: Île-de-France
- Department: Seine-et-Marne
- Arrondissement: Melun
- Canton: Melun
- Intercommunality: CA Melun Val de Seine

Government
  - Mayor (2020–2026): Alain Plaisance
- Area^{1}: 10.19 km^{2} (3.93 sq mi)
- Highest elevation: 103 m (338 ft)
- Lowest elevation: 42 m (138 ft)
- Population (2023): 1,828
  - Density: 179.4/km^{2} (464.6/sq mi)
- Time zone: UTC+01:00 (CET)
  - Summer (DST): UTC+02:00 (CEST)
- INSEE/Postal code: 77269 /77950
- ^{1} French Land Register data, which excludes lakes, ponds, glaciers > 1 km^{2} (0.386 sq mi or 247 acres) and river estuaries.

Maincy (French pronunciation: [mɛ̃si]) is a commune in the Seine-et-Marne department in the Île-de-France region in north-central France.

The chateau of Vaux-le-Vicomte is located in the commune.

== Demographics ==
Inhabitants are called Maincéens.

== See also ==
- Communes of the Seine-et-Marne department
