= Canton of Le Châtelet-en-Brie =

Coordinates: 48°29′50″N 2°48′37″E

Le Châtelet-en-Brie
- Former canton
- Interactive map of Le Châtelet-en-Brie
- Country: France
- Region: Île-de-France
- Department: Seine-et-Marne
- No. of communes: {{{nbcomm}}}
- Disbanded: 2015
- Area: 178.70 km^{2} (69.00 sq mi)
- Population (2012): 15,511
  - Density: 86.799/km^{2} (224.81/sq mi)

The canton of Le Châtelet-en-Brie is a French former administrative division, located in the arrondissement of Melun, in the Seine-et-Marne département (Île-de-France région). It was disbanded following the French canton reorganisation which came into effect in March 2015. It consisted of 13 communes, which joined the canton of Nangis in 2015.

== Demographics ==
Historical population
Year	Pop.	±%
1999	14,618	—
2006	15,176	+3.8%
2012	15,511	+2.2%

== Composition ==
The canton of Le Châtelet-en-Brie was composed of 13 communes:

- Blandy
- Chartrettes
- Le Châtelet-en-Brie
- Châtillon-la-Borde
- Échouboulains
- Les Écrennes
- Féricy
- Fontaine-le-Port
- Machault
- Moisenay
- Pamfou
- Sivry-Courtry
- Valence-en-Brie

== See also ==
- Cantons of the Seine-et-Marne department
- Communes of the Seine-et-Marne department
