= Canton of Mormant =

Coordinates: 48°36′14″N 2°51′45″E

Mormant
- Former canton
- Interactive map of Mormant
- Country: France
- Region: Île-de-France
- Department: Seine-et-Marne
- No. of communes: {{{nbcomm}}}
- Disbanded: 2015
- Area: 240.71 km^{2} (92.94 sq mi)
- Population (2012): 23,660
  - Density: 98.29/km^{2} (254.6/sq mi)

The canton of Mormant is a French former administrative division, located in the arrondissement of Melun, in the Seine-et-Marne département (Île-de-France région). It was disbanded following the French canton reorganisation which came into effect in March 2015. It consisted of 22 communes, which joined the canton of Nangis in 2015.

== Demographics ==
Historical population
| Year | Pop. | ±% |
|---|---|---|
| 1999 | 21,679 | — |
| 2006 | 22,547 | +4.0% |
| 2012 | 23,660 | +4.9% |

== Composition ==
The canton of Mormant was composed of 22 communes:

- Andrezel
- Argentières
- Aubepierre-Ozouer-le-Repos
- Beauvoir
- Bombon
- Bréau
- Champdeuil
- Champeaux
- La Chapelle-Gauthier
- Clos-Fontaine
- Courtomer
- Crisenoy
- Fontenailles
- Fouju
- Grandpuits-Bailly-Carrois
- Guignes
- Mormant
- Quiers
- Saint-Méry
- Saint-Ouen-en-Brie
- Verneuil-l'Étang
- Yèbles

== See also ==
- Cantons of the Seine-et-Marne department
- Communes of the Seine-et-Marne department
