= Communauté de communes Vallées et Châteaux =

Vallées et Châteaux
- Former communauté de communes
- Interactive map of Vallées et Châteaux
- Coordinates: 48.5037°N 2.7909°E
- Country: France
- Region: Île-de-France
- Department: Seine-et-Marne
- No. of communes: {{{nbcomm}}}
- Established: 1973
- Disbanded: 2017
- Area: 184.20 km^{2} (71.12 sq mi)
- Population (2013): 14,786
  - Density: 80.271/km^{2} (207.90/sq mi)

The Communauté de communes Vallées et Châteaux (before 2010: Communauté de communes de la Région du Châtelet-en-Brie) is a former federation of municipalities (communauté de communes) in the Seine-et-Marne department in the Île-de-France region of France. Created in 1973, its seat was in Le Châtelet-en-Brie. It was dissolved in January 2017 when most of its communes joined the new Communauté de communes de la Brie des Rivières et Châteaux.

== Composition ==
The Communauté de communes de la Région du Châtelet-en-Brie included 13 communes:

- Blandy
- Le Châtelet-en-Brie
- Châtillon-la-Borde
- Crisenoy
- Échouboulains
- Les Écrennes
- Féricy
- Machault
- Maincy
- Moisenay
- Pamfou
- Sivry-Courtry
- Valence-en-Brie

== See also ==
- Communes of the Seine-et-Marne department
