= Communauté de communes Les Gués de l'Yerres =

Coordinates: 48.6834°N 2.6653°E

Les Gués de l'Yerres
- Former communauté de communes
- Country: France
- Region: Île-de-France
- Department: Seine-et-Marne
- No. of communes: {{{nbcomm}}}
- Established: 2004
- Disbanded: 2017
- Area: 97 km^{2} (37 sq mi)
- Population (2013): 13,254
  - Density: 140/km^{2} (350/sq mi)

The Communauté de communes Les Gués de l'Yerres is a former federation of municipalities (communauté de communes) in the Seine-et-Marne département and in the Île-de-France région of France. It was created in December 2004. In 2017, most of its communes became part of the new Communauté de communes de la Brie des Rivières et Châteaux.

== Composition ==
The Communauté de communes comprised the following communes:

- Coubert
- Courquetaine
- Évry-Grégy-sur-Yerre
- Grisy-Suisnes
- Limoges-Fourches
- Lissy
- Ozouer-le-Voulgis
- Soignolles-en-Brie
- Solers

== See also ==
- Communes of the Seine-et-Marne department
