= Communauté de communes La Brie Centrale =

Coordinates: 48.6455°N 2.8354°E

La Brie Centrale
- Former communauté de communes
- Interactive map of La Brie Centrale
- Country: France
- Region: Île-de-France
- Department: Seine-et-Marne
- No. of communes: {{{nbcomm}}}
- Established: 2004
- Disbanded: 2017
- Area: 59 km^{2} (23 sq mi)
- Population (2013): 7,022
  - Density: 120/km^{2} (310/sq mi)

The Communauté de communes La Brie Centrale is a former federation of municipalities (communauté de communes) in the Seine-et-Marne département and in the Île-de-France région of France. It was created in December 2004. It was dissolved in January 2017.

== Composition ==
The Communauté de communes comprised the following communes:

- Andrezel
- Argentières
- Beauvoir
- Champdeuil
- Champeaux
- Fouju
- Verneuil-l'Étang
- Yèbles

== See also ==
- Communes of the Seine-et-Marne department
