= Communauté de communes de la Brie des Rivières et Châteaux =

Federation of municipalities in France

Brie des Rivières et Châteaux
- Communauté de communes
- Interactive map of Brie des Rivières et Châteaux
- Coordinates: 48°31′N 02°47′E
- Country: France
- Region: Île-de-France
- Department: Seine-et-Marne
- No. of communes: {{{nbcomm}}}
- Established: 2017
- Area: 366.2 km^{2} (141.4 sq mi)
- Population (2019): 39,557
  - Density: 108.0/km^{2} (279.8/sq mi)

The Communauté de communes de la Brie des Rivières et Châteaux is a communauté de communes in the Seine-et-Marne département and in the Île-de-France région of France. It was formed on 1 January 2017 by several communes of the former Communauté de communes La Brie Centrale, Communauté de communes Les Gués de l'Yerres, Communauté de communes du Pays de Seine, Communauté de communes Vallées et Châteaux and Communauté de communes de l'Yerres à l'Ancœur. Its seat is in Le Châtelet-en-Brie. Its area is 366.2 km^{2}, and its population was 39,557 in 2019.

== Composition ==
The communauté de communes consists of the following 31 communes:

1. Andrezel
2. Argentières
3. Beauvoir
4. Blandy
5. Bombon
6. Champdeuil
7. Champeaux
8. Le Châtelet-en-Brie
9. Châtillon-la-Borde
10. Chaumes-en-Brie
11. Coubert
12. Courquetaine
13. Crisenoy
14. Échouboulains
15. Les Écrennes
16. Évry-Grégy-sur-Yerre
17. Féricy
18. Fontaine-le-Port
19. Fouju
20. Grisy-Suisnes
21. Guignes
22. Machault
23. Moisenay
24. Ozouer-le-Voulgis
25. Pamfou
26. Saint-Méry
27. Sivry-Courtry
28. Soignolles-en-Brie
29. Solers
30. Valence-en-Brie
31. Yèbles
