= Communauté de communes de l'Yerres à l'Ancœur =

Coordinates: 48.7171°N 2.4881°E

de l'Yerres à l'Ancœur
- Former communauté de communes
- Country: France
- Region: Île-de-France
- Department: Seine-et-Marne
- No. of communes: {{{nbcomm}}}
- Established: 2005
- Disbanded: 2017
- Area: 117 km^{2} (45 sq mi)
- Population (2013): 15,495
  - Density: 132/km^{2} (343/sq mi)

The Communauté de communes de l'Yerres à l'Ancœur is a former communauté de communes in the Seine-et-Marne département and in the Île-de-France région of France. It was created in November 2005. It was dissolved in January 2017.

== Composition ==
The Communauté de communes comprised the following communes:

- Aubepierre-Ozouer-le-Repos
- Bombon
- Bréau
- La Chapelle-Gauthier
- Chaumes-en-Brie
- Courtomer
- Guignes
- Mormant
- Saint-Méry
