= William of Champeaux =

French theologian and philosopher

- Born: c. 1070; Champeaux, Kingdom of France
- Died: 18 January 1121; Châlons-en-Champagne, Kingdom of France
- Occupation: Bishop of Châlons-en-Champagne

Education
- Academic advisor: Anselm of Laon

Philosophical work
- Era: Medieval philosophy
- Region: Western philosophy
- School: Scholasticism
- Notable students: Peter Abelard
- Main interests: Logic, metaphysics, theology
- Notable ideas: Realist theory of universals

Guillaume de Champeaux (French: Guillaume de Champeaux; c. 1070 – 18 January 1121), known in English as William of Champeaux and Latinised to Gulielmus de Campellis, was a French philosopher and theologian.

== Biography ==
William was born at Champeaux near Melun. After studying under Anselm of Laon and Roscellinus, he taught in the school of the cathedral of Notre-Dame, of which he was made canon in 1103. Among his pupils was Peter Abelard, whom he had a disagreement with because Abelard challenged some of his ideas, and because William thought Abelard was too arrogant. Abelard calls him the "supreme master" of dialectic after he replaced his master as the new teacher. In 1108 he resigned his positions as archdeacon of Paris and master of Notre Dame, and retreated to the shrine of St Victor, outside the city walls of Paris, where, under his influence, there formed what would become the abbey of St Victor.

He was a friend of Bernard of Clairvaux, having helped Bernard recuperate from ill-health; later he motivated Bernard to write some of his important works including the Apologia, which was dedicated to William.

William left St Victor in 1113 when he became bishop of Châlons-en-Champagne. At that time, he took part in the dispute concerning investitures as a supporter of Pope Callixtus II, whom he represented at the conference of Mousson. In 1114, he issued the Grande charte champenoise (Great Champagne Chart) which defined the agricultural and viticultural possessions of the Abbey of Saint-Pierre-aux-Monts, thus giving rise to the modern-day Champagne wine region. After relinquishing his Benedictine Abbacy, he moved to a Cistercian monastery in Rheims, where he also composed a number of spiritual books, such as his Vita Prima, which were widely read in monastic circles.

His surviving works are a fragment on the Eucharist, inserted by Jean Mabillon in his edition of the works of St Bernard, and the Moralia A brevi ala and De Origine Animae. In the last of these he maintains that children who die unbaptized must be lost, the pure soul being defiled by the grossness of the body, and declares that God's will is not to be questioned. He upholds the theory of creationism (i.e., that a soul is specially created for each human being). Félix Ravaisson has discovered a number of fragments by him, among which the most important is the De Essentia Dei et de Substantia Dei; a Liber Sententiarum, consisting of discussions on ethics and scriptural interpretation, is also ascribed to Champeaux.

He is considered the founder of an early version of medieval realism, according to which individuals of the same species share a common universal substance and are individuated by accidents; after criticism from Abelard, he adopted a weaker realist position.

== Bibliography ==
- Cameron, Margaret. What's in a Name? Students of William of Champeaux on the Vox Significativa, Bochumer Philosophisches Jahrbuch fur Antike und Mittelalter 9, 2004, pp. 93–114.
- Iwakuma, Yuko. William of Champeaux, On Aristotle's Categories, in Joël Biard, Irène Rosier-Catach (eds.), La tradition médiévale des Catégories (XII - XV siècle), Louvain-Paris: Peeters, 2003, pp. 313–328.
- Mews, Constant. Logica in the Service of Philosophy: William of Champeaux and his Influence, Rener Berndt (ed.), Schrift, Schreiber, Schenker. Studien zur Abtei Sankt Viktor in Paris und de Viktorinen, Berlin, Aksademie Verlag, 2005, pp. 77–117.
