= Communauté de communes du Pays de Seine =

Coordinates: 48.4869°N 2.7573°E

Pays de Seine
- Former communauté de communes
- Country: France
- Region: Île-de-France
- Department: Seine-et-Marne
- No. of communes: {{{nbcomm}}}
- Established: 2002
- Disbanded: 2017
- Area: 30.28 km^{2} (11.69 sq mi)
- Population (1999): 10,986
  - Density: 362.8/km^{2} (939.7/sq mi)

The Communauté de communes du Pays de Seine is a former federation of municipalities (communauté de communes) in the Seine-et-Marne département and in the Île-de-France région of France. It was created in November 2002. It was dissolved in January 2017.

== Composition ==
The Communauté de communes comprised the following communes:

- Bois-le-Roi
- Chartrettes
- Fontaine-le-Port
- Samois-sur-Seine

== See also ==
- Communes of the Seine-et-Marne department
