= Coubert =

- Commune
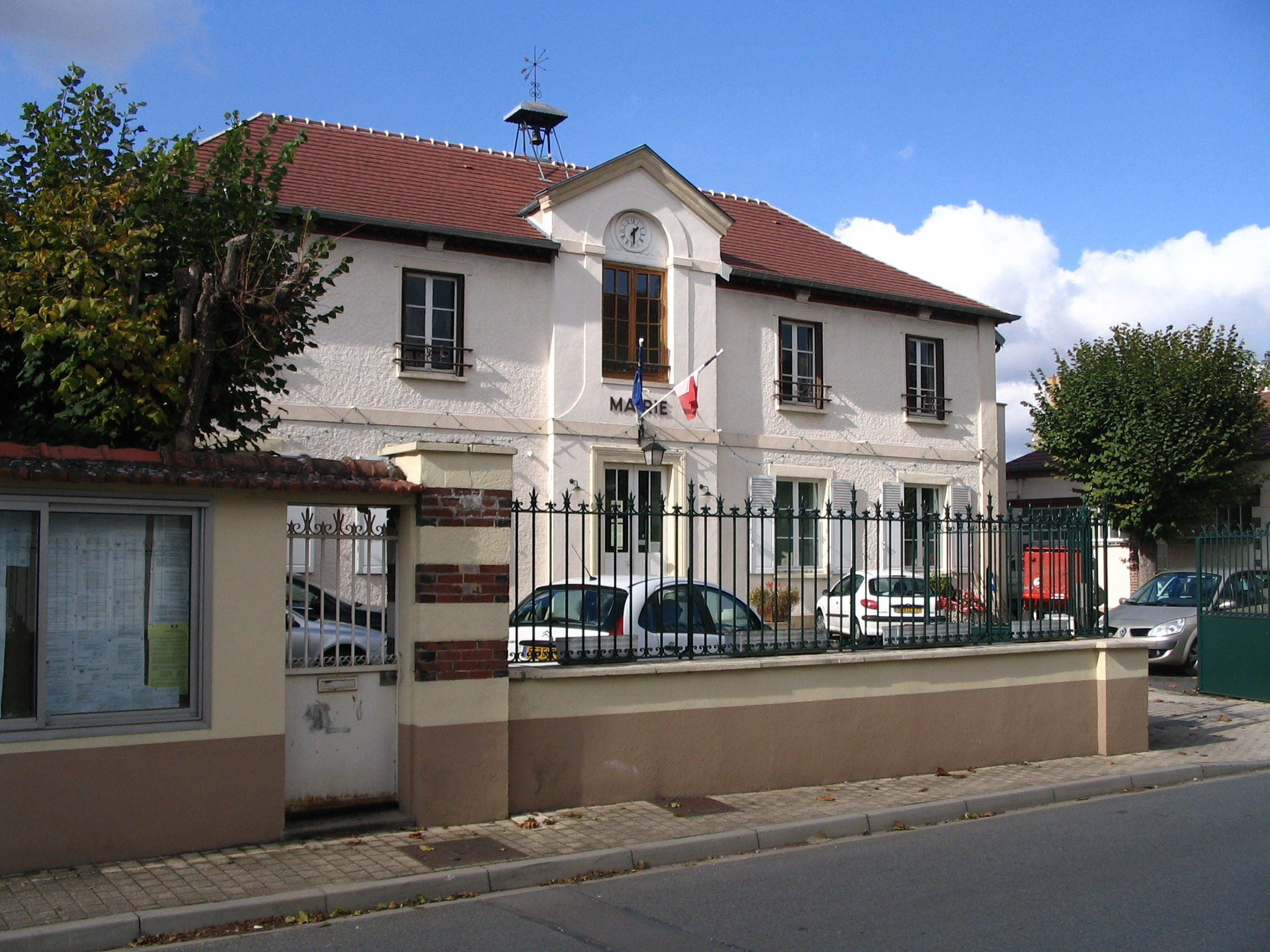
- The town hall in Coubert

- Coat of arms
- Location of Coubert
- Location within France Location within Île-de-France (region)
- Coordinates: 48°40′20″N 2°41′46″E
- Country: France
- Region: Île-de-France
- Department: Seine-et-Marne
- Arrondissement: Melun
- Canton: Fontenay-Trésigny
- Intercommunality: CC Brie des Rivières et Châteaux

Government
  - Mayor (2020–2026): Louis Saout
- Area^{1}: 8.36 km^{2} (3.23 sq mi)
- Highest elevation: 106 m (348 ft)
- Lowest elevation: 78 m (256 ft)
- Population (2023): 2,005
  - Density: 240/km^{2} (621/sq mi)
- Time zone: UTC+01:00 (CET)
  - Summer (DST): UTC+02:00 (CEST)
- INSEE/Postal code: 77127 /77170
- ^{1} French Land Register data, which excludes lakes, ponds, glaciers > 1 km^{2} (0.386 sq mi or 247 acres) and river estuaries.

Coubert (French pronunciation: [kubɛʁ]) is a commune in the Seine-et-Marne department in the Île-de-France region in north-central France.

== Demographics ==
The inhabitants are called Curtibéhardiens in French.

Historical population
Year	Pop.	±% p.a.
1968	903	—
1975	989	+1.31%
1982	1,067	+1.09%
1990	1,054	−0.15%
1999	1,275	+2.14%
2007	1,752	+4.05%
2012	2,020	+2.89%
2017	1,934	−0.87%
2023	2,005	+0.60%
Source: INSEE

== See also ==
- Communes of the Seine-et-Marne department
