= Courquetaine =

- Commune
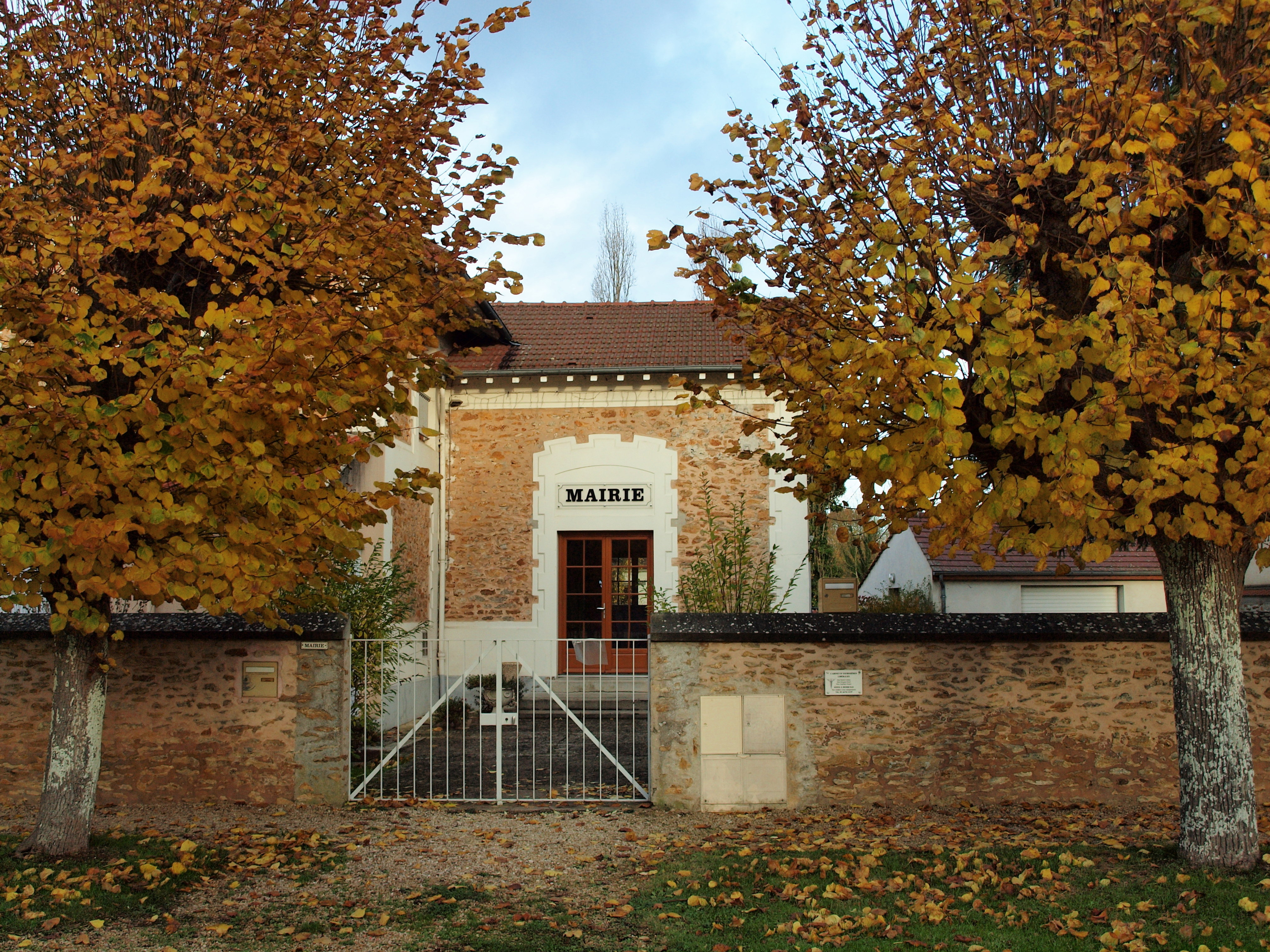
- The town hall in Courquetaine
- Location of Courquetaine
- Location within France Location within Île-de-France (region)
- Coordinates: 48°40′37″N 2°44′50″E
- Country: France
- Region: Île-de-France
- Department: Seine-et-Marne
- Arrondissement: Melun
- Canton: Fontenay-Trésigny
- Intercommunality: CC Brie des Rivières et Châteaux

Government
  - Mayor (2020–2026): Daisy Luczak
- Area^{1}: 7.82 km^{2} (3.02 sq mi)
- Highest elevation: 106 m (348 ft)
- Lowest elevation: 75 m (246 ft)
- Population (2023): 184
  - Density: 23.5/km^{2} (60.9/sq mi)
- Time zone: UTC+01:00 (CET)
  - Summer (DST): UTC+02:00 (CEST)
- INSEE/Postal code: 77136 /77390
- ^{1} French Land Register data, which excludes lakes, ponds, glaciers > 1 km^{2} (0.386 sq mi or 247 acres) and river estuaries.

Courquetaine (French pronunciation: [kuʁkətɛn]) is a commune in the Seine-et-Marne département in the Île-de-France region in north-central France.

== Demographics ==
The inhabitants are called Courquetainois.

== See also ==
- Communes of the Seine-et-Marne department
