= Solers =

- Commune
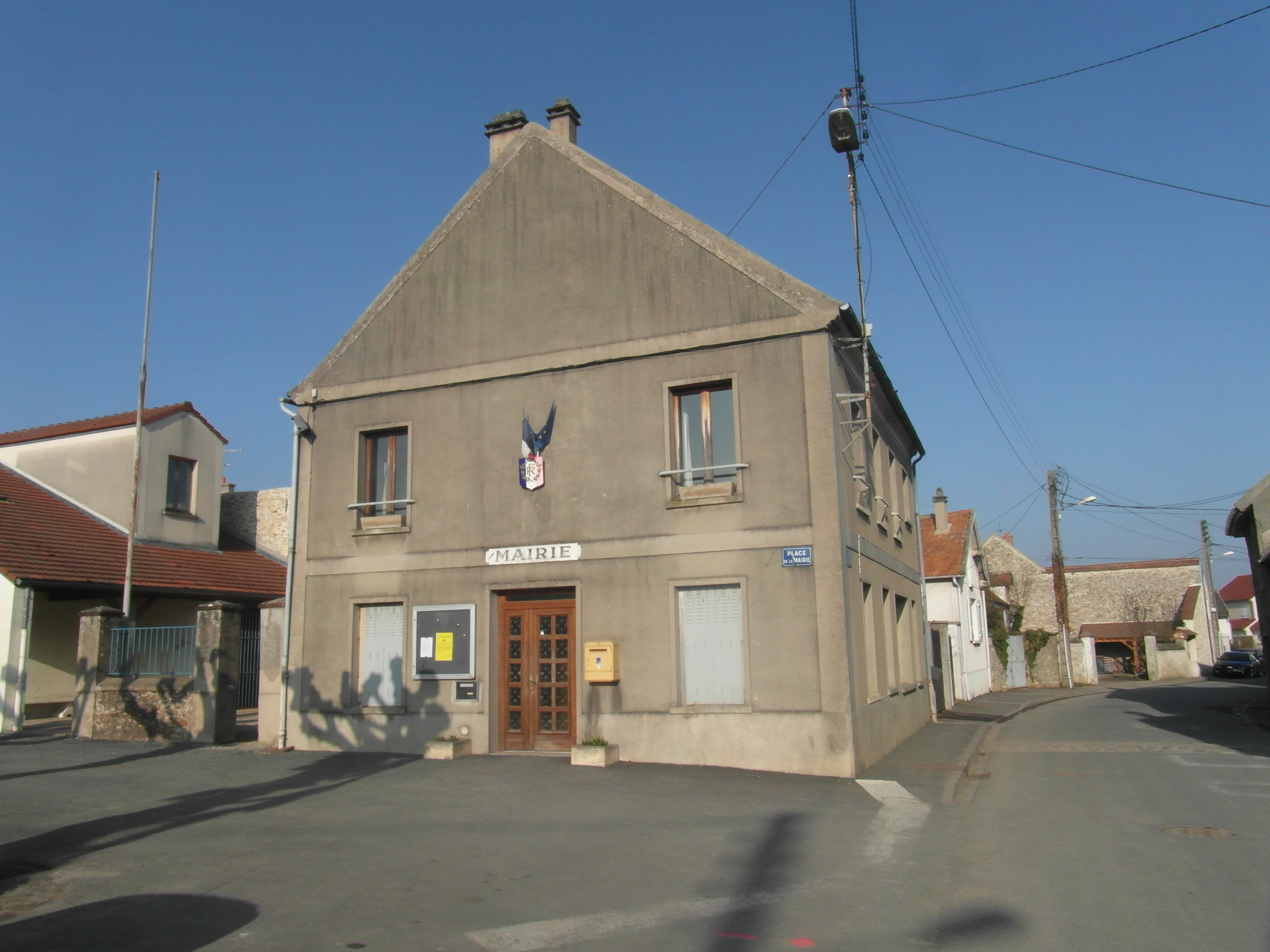
- The town hall in Solers
- Location of Solers
- Location within France Location within Île-de-France (region)
- Coordinates: 48°39′28″N 2°43′01″E
- Country: France
- Region: Île-de-France
- Department: Seine-et-Marne
- Arrondissement: Melun
- Canton: Fontenay-Trésigny
- Intercommunality: CC Brie des Rivières et Châteaux

Government
  - Mayor (2020–2026): Gilles Groslevin
- Area^{1}: 6.28 km^{2} (2.42 sq mi)
- Highest elevation: 102 m (335 ft)
- Lowest elevation: 62 m (203 ft)
- Population (2023): 1,336
  - Density: 213/km^{2} (551/sq mi)
- Time zone: UTC+01:00 (CET)
  - Summer (DST): UTC+02:00 (CEST)
- INSEE/Postal code: 77457 /77111
- ^{1} French Land Register data, which excludes lakes, ponds, glaciers > 1 km^{2} (0.386 sq mi or 247 acres) and river estuaries.

Solers is a commune in the Seine-et-Marne department in the Île-de-France region in north-central France.

== Demographics ==
Inhabitants of Solers are called Solersois.

== German WWII cemetery ==
=== Gallery ===
Cimetière militaire allemand
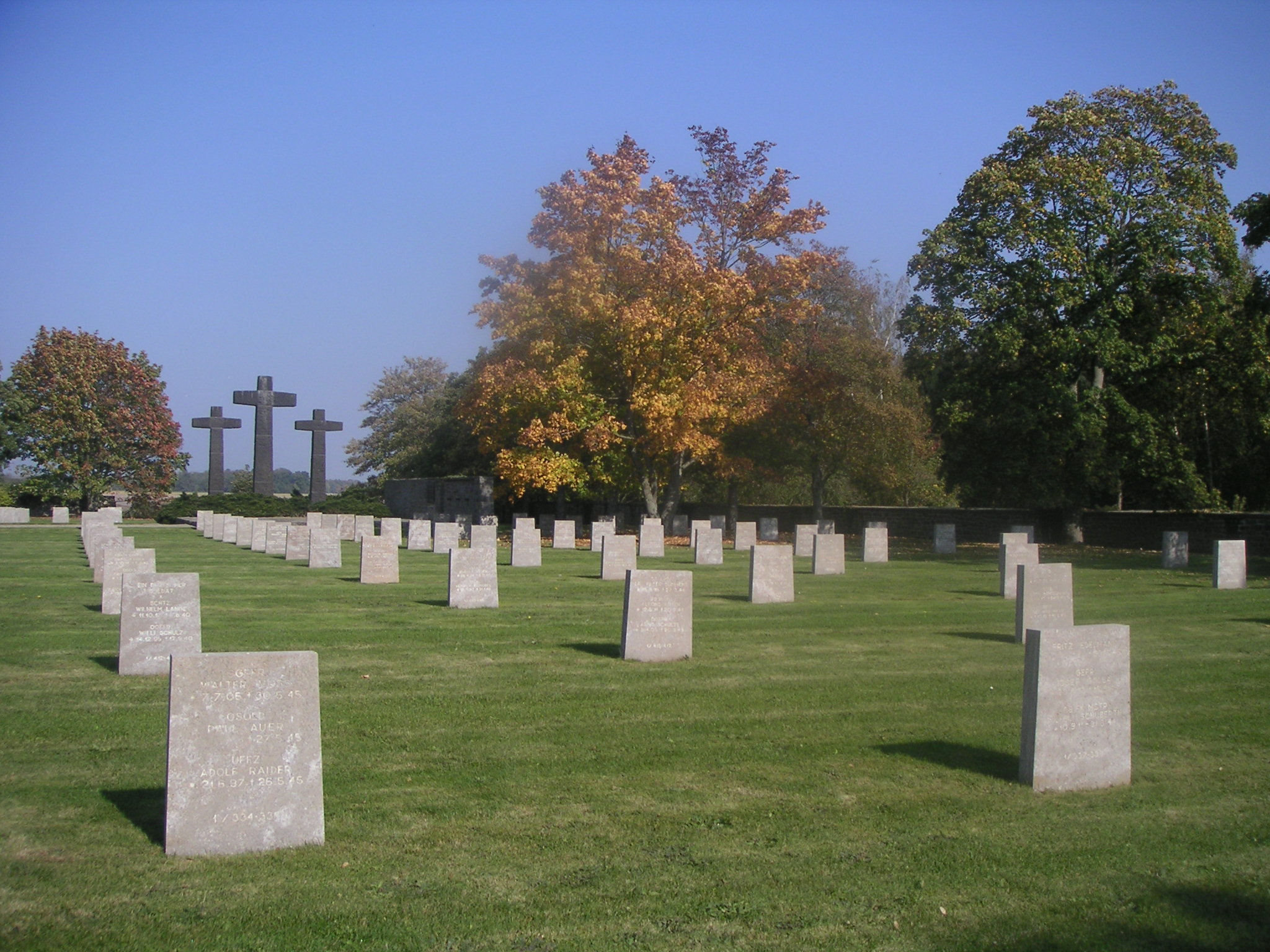

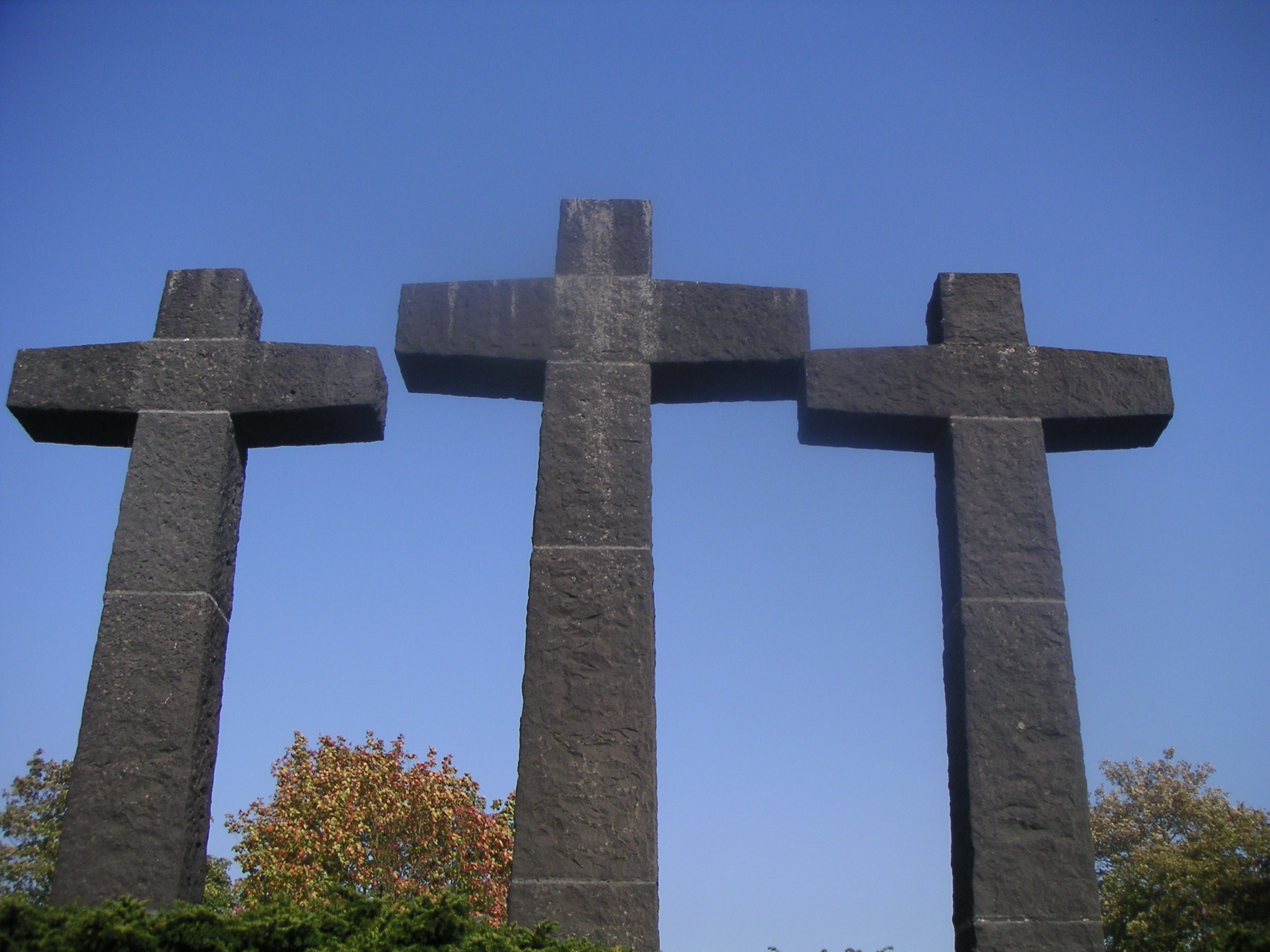

== See also ==
- Communes of the Seine-et-Marne department
