= Grisy-Suisnes =

- Commune
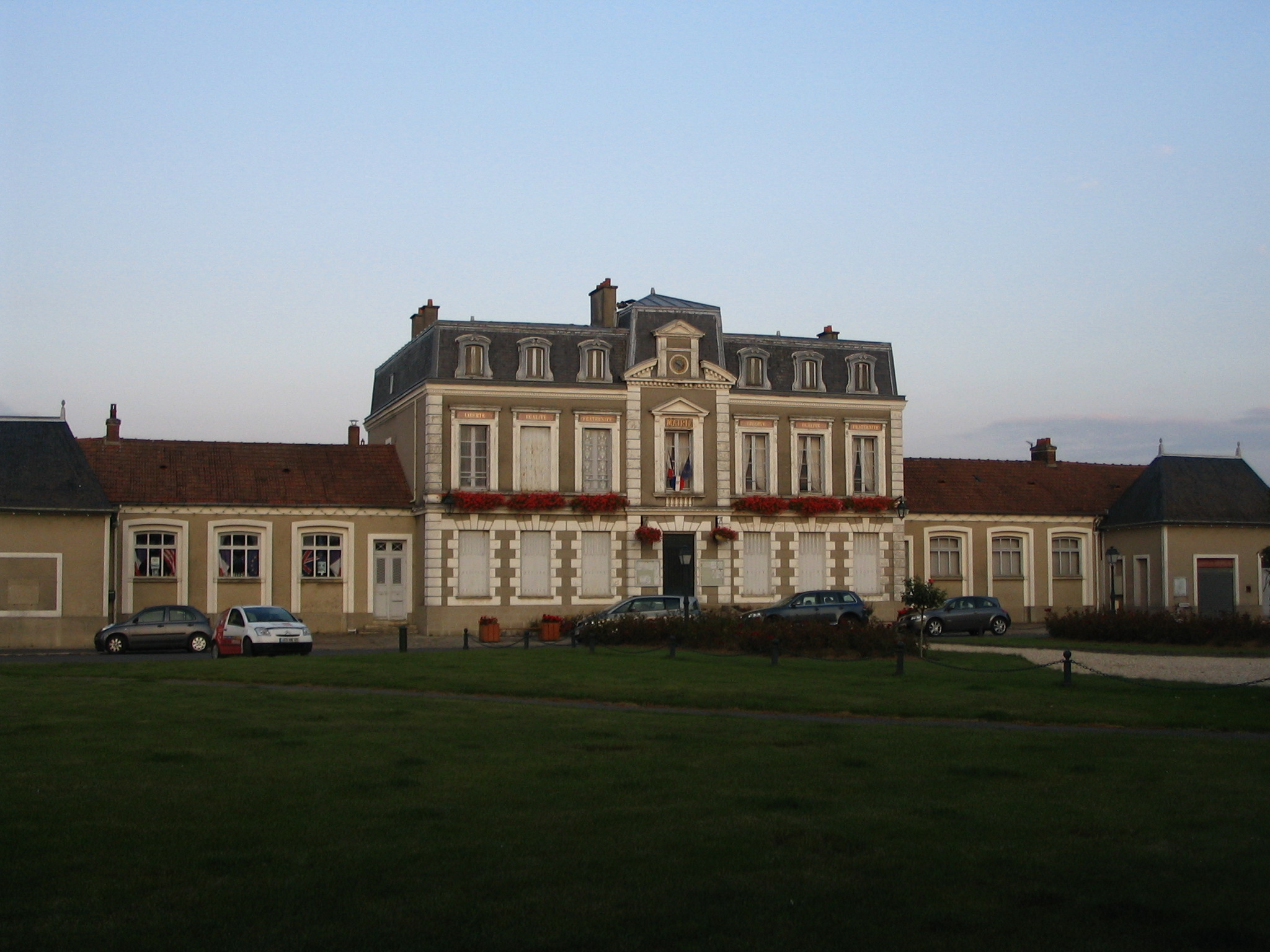
- The town hall in Grisy-Suisnes

- Coat of arms
- Location of Grisy-Suisnes
- Location within France Location within Île-de-France (region)
- Coordinates: 48°41′00″N 2°40′00″E
- Country: France
- Region: Île-de-France
- Department: Seine-et-Marne
- Arrondissement: Melun
- Canton: Fontenay-Trésigny
- Intercommunality: CC Brie des Rivières et Châteaux

Government
  - Mayor (2020–2026): Jean-Marc Chanussot
- Area^{1}: 18.34 km^{2} (7.08 sq mi)
- Highest elevation: 106 m (348 ft)
- Lowest elevation: 56 m (184 ft)
- Population (2023): 2,948
  - Density: 160.7/km^{2} (416.3/sq mi)
- Time zone: UTC+01:00 (CET)
  - Summer (DST): UTC+02:00 (CEST)
- INSEE/Postal code: 77217 /77166
- ^{1} French Land Register data, which excludes lakes, ponds, glaciers > 1 km^{2} (0.386 sq mi or 247 acres) and river estuaries.

Grisy-Suisnes (French pronunciation: [ɡʁizi sɥin]) is a commune in the Seine-et-Marne department in the Île-de-France region in north-central France.

== Population ==
Historical population
| Year | Pop. | ±% p.a. |
|---|---|---|
| 1968 | 1,088 | — |
| 1975 | 1,228 | +1.74% |
| 1982 | 1,379 | +1.67% |
| 1990 | 1,648 | +2.25% |
| 1999 | 1,989 | +2.11% |
| 2007 | 2,287 | +1.76% |
| 2012 | 2,363 | +0.66% |
| 2017 | 2,451 | +0.73% |
| 2023 | 2,948 | +3.13% |
Source: INSEE

Inhabitants are called Grisysoliens in French.

== See also ==
- Communes of the Seine-et-Marne department
- Louis Leygue Sculptor
