= Ozouer-le-Voulgis =

- Commune
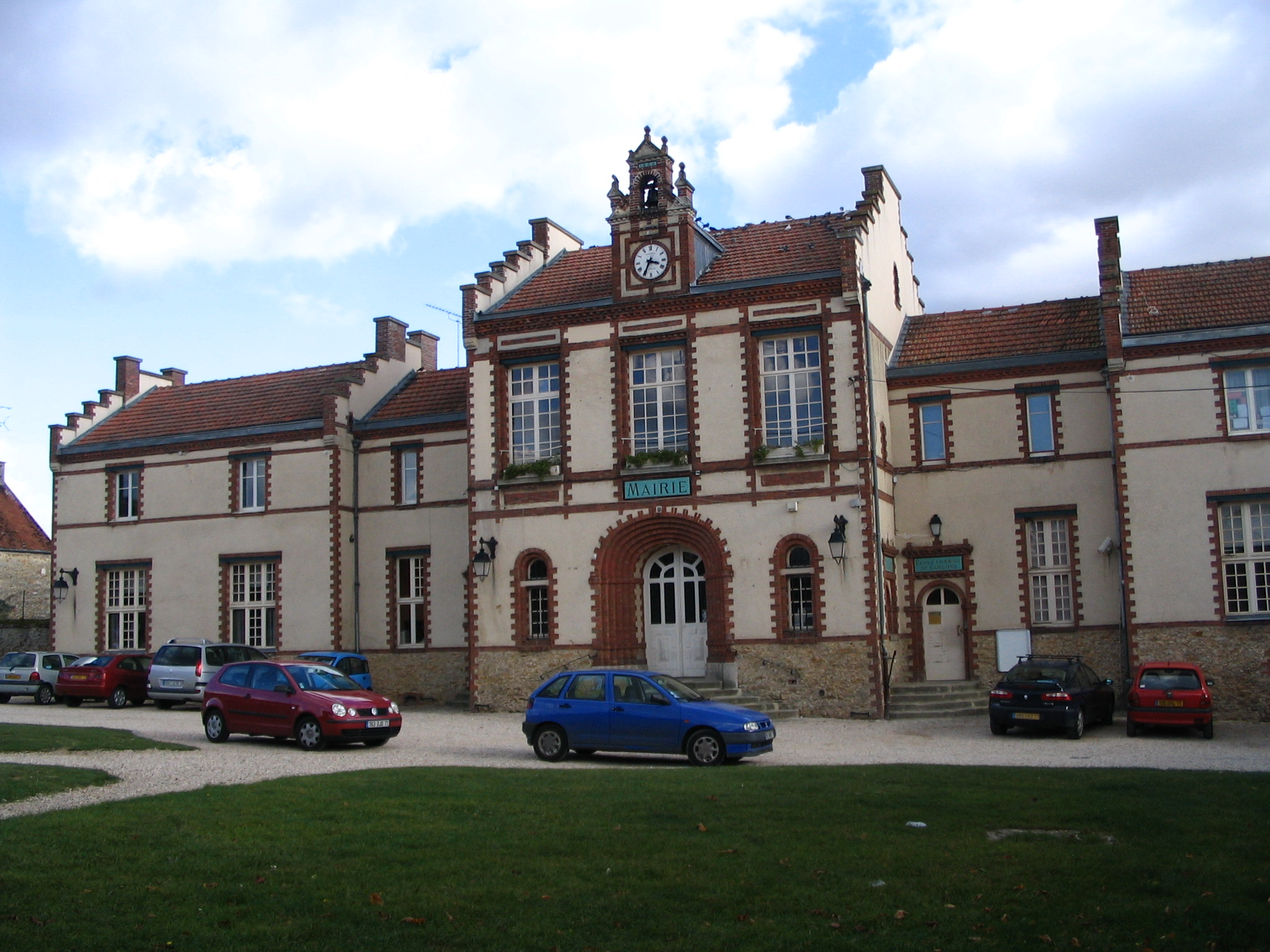
- The town hall in Ozouer-le-Voulgis
- Location of Ozouer-le-Voulgis
- Location within France Location within Île-de-France (region)
- Coordinates: 48°39′37″N 2°46′29″E
- Country: France
- Region: Île-de-France
- Department: Seine-et-Marne
- Arrondissement: Melun
- Canton: Fontenay-Trésigny
- Intercommunality: CC Brie des Rivières et Châteaux

Government
  - Mayor (2022–2026): Gérard Champin
- Area^{1}: 11.30 km^{2} (4.36 sq mi)
- Highest elevation: 104 m (341 ft)
- Lowest elevation: 62 m (203 ft)
- Population (2023): 2,050
  - Density: 181/km^{2} (470/sq mi)
- Time zone: UTC+01:00 (CET)
  - Summer (DST): UTC+02:00 (CEST)
- INSEE/Postal code: 77352 /77390
- ^{1} French Land Register data, which excludes lakes, ponds, glaciers > 1 km^{2} (0.386 sq mi or 247 acres) and river estuaries.

Ozouer-le-Voulgis (French: [ozwɛʁ lə vulʒi]) is a commune in the Seine-et-Marne department in the Île-de-France region in north-central France.

== Demographics ==
Inhabitants are called Ozouriens in French.

Historical population
Year	Pop.	±% p.a.
1968	887	—
1975	1,013	+1.92%
1982	1,112	+1.34%
1990	1,286	+1.83%
1999	1,544	+2.05%
2007	1,685	+1.10%
2012	1,826	+1.62%
2017	1,904	+0.84%
2023	2,050	+1.24%
Source: INSEE

== See also ==
- Communes of the Seine-et-Marne department
