= Soignolles-en-Brie =

- Commune
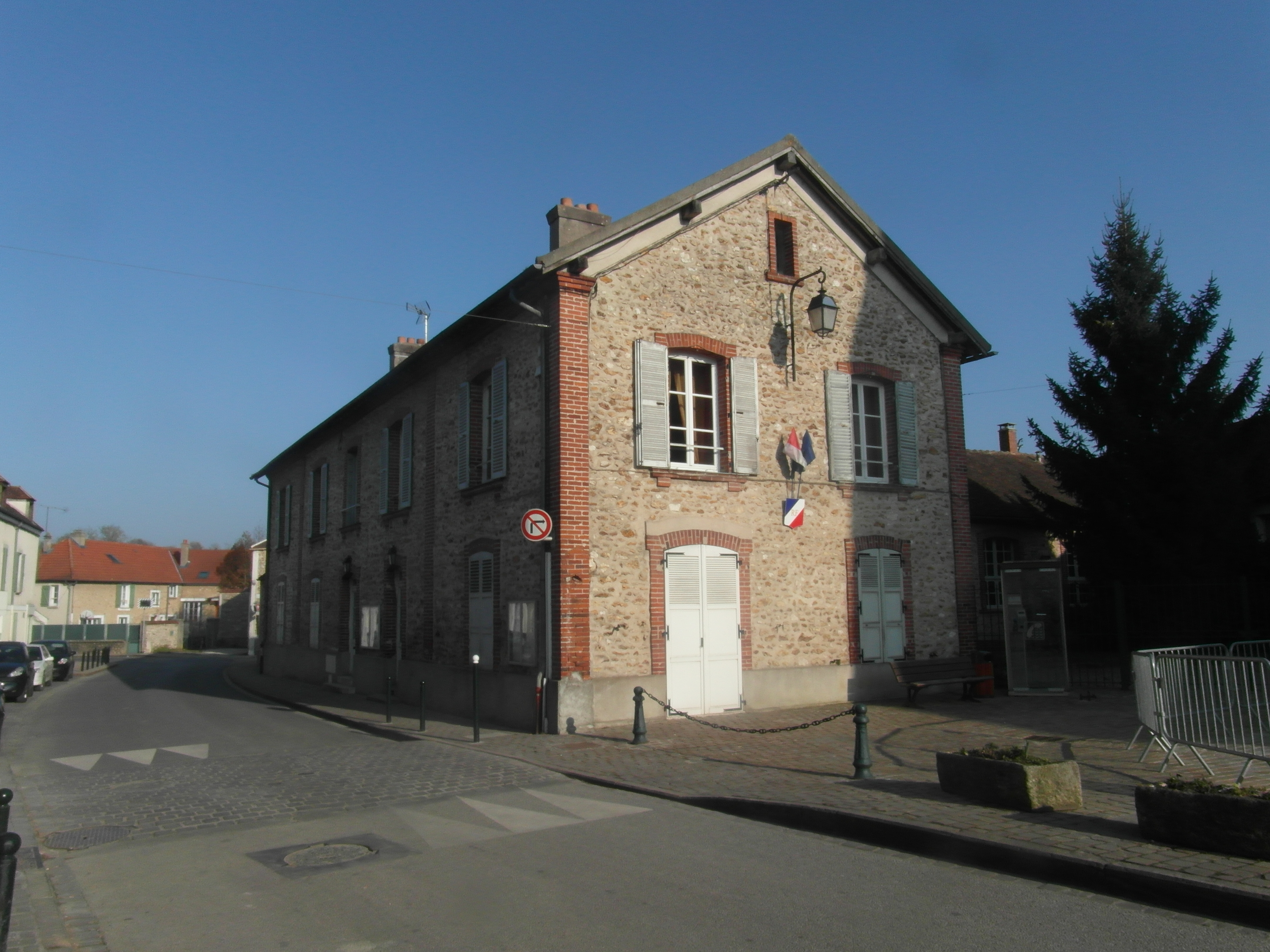
- The town hall in Soignolles-en-Brie

- Coat of arms
- Location of Soignolles-en-Brie
- Location within France Location within Île-de-France (region)
- Coordinates: 48°39′20″N 2°42′02″E
- Country: France
- Region: Île-de-France
- Department: Seine-et-Marne
- Arrondissement: Melun
- Canton: Fontenay-Trésigny
- Intercommunality: CC Brie des Rivières et Châteaux

Government
  - Mayor (2020–2026): Serge Barberi
- Area^{1}: 10.77 km^{2} (4.16 sq mi)
- Highest elevation: 97 m (318 ft)
- Lowest elevation: 57 m (187 ft)
- Population (2023): 2,021
  - Density: 187.7/km^{2} (486.0/sq mi)
- Time zone: UTC+01:00 (CET)
  - Summer (DST): UTC+02:00 (CEST)
- INSEE/Postal code: 77455 /77111
- ^{1} French Land Register data, which excludes lakes, ponds, glaciers > 1 km^{2} (0.386 sq mi or 247 acres) and river estuaries.

Soignolles-en-Brie (French pronunciation: [swaɲɔl ɑ̃ bʁi], literally Soignolles in Brie) is a commune in the Seine-et-Marne department in the Île-de-France region in north-central France.

== Population ==
Historical population
Year	Pop.	±% p.a.
1968	840	—
1975	940	+1.62%
1982	1,113	+2.44%
1990	1,474	+3.57%
1999	1,962	+3.23%
2007	2,008	+0.29%
2012	2,084	+0.75%
2017	1,957	−1.25%
2023	2,021	+0.54%
Source: INSEE

Inhabitants of Soignolles-en-Brie are called Soignollais in French.

== See also ==
- Communes of the Seine-et-Marne department
