= Courtomer, Seine-et-Marne =

Courtomer
- Commune
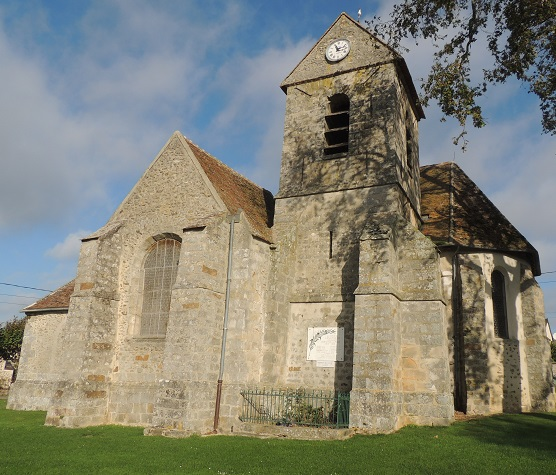
- The church in Courtomer
- Location of Courtomer
- Location within France Location within Île-de-France (region)
- Coordinates: 48°39′18″N 2°54′11″E
- Country: France
- Region: Île-de-France
- Department: Seine-et-Marne
- Arrondissement: Provins
- Canton: Nangis
- Intercommunality: CC Val Briard

Government
  - Mayor (2020–2026): Jocelyne Vaneson
- Area^{1}: 4.62 km^{2} (1.78 sq mi)
- Highest elevation: 114 m (374 ft)
- Lowest elevation: 76 m (249 ft)
- Population (2023): 591
  - Density: 128/km^{2} (331/sq mi)
- Time zone: UTC+01:00 (CET)
  - Summer (DST): UTC+02:00 (CEST)
- INSEE/Postal code: 77138 /77390
- ^{1} French Land Register data, which excludes lakes, ponds, glaciers > 1 km^{2} (0.386 sq mi or 247 acres) and river estuaries.

Courtomer is a commune in the Seine-et-Marne department in the Île-de-France region in north-central France.

== Demographics ==
The inhabitants are called Courtomerois.

== See also ==
- Communes of the Seine-et-Marne department
