= Champdeuil =

- Commune
- Location of Champdeuil
- Location within France Location within Île-de-France (region)
- Coordinates: 48°37′N 2°44′E
- Country: France
- Region: Île-de-France
- Department: Seine-et-Marne
- Arrondissement: Melun
- Canton: Nangis
- Intercommunality: CC Brie des Rivières et Châteaux

Government
  - Mayor (2021–2026): Gilbert Jarossay
- Area^{1}: 3.97 km^{2} (1.53 sq mi)
- Highest elevation: 98 m (322 ft)
- Lowest elevation: 88 m (289 ft)
- Population (2023): 739
  - Density: 186/km^{2} (482/sq mi)
- Time zone: UTC+01:00 (CET)
  - Summer (DST): UTC+02:00 (CEST)
- INSEE/Postal code: 77081 /77390
- ^{1} French Land Register data, which excludes lakes, ponds, glaciers > 1 km^{2} (0.386 sq mi or 247 acres) and river estuaries.

Champdeuil (French pronunciation: [ʃɑ̃dœj]) is a commune in the Seine-et-Marne department in the Île-de-France region in north-central France.

== See also ==
- Communes of the Seine-et-Marne department
