= Canton of Nangis =

Coordinates: 48°36′27″N 3°06′27″E

Nangis
- Canton
- Country: France
- Region: Île-de-France
- Department: Seine-et-Marne
- No. of communes: {{{nbcomm}}}
- Area: 579.85 km^{2} (223.88 sq mi)
- Population (2023): 61,443
  - Density: 105.96/km^{2} (274.44/sq mi)
- INSEE code: 77 14

The canton of Nangis is a French administrative division, located in the Seine-et-Marne département (Île-de-France région).

== Demographics ==
Historical population
Year	Pop.	±% p.a.
2013	57,952	—
2018	60,315	+0.80%
Source: INSEE

== Composition ==
At the French canton reorganisation which came into effect in March 2015, the canton was expanded from 17 to 46 communes:

- Andrezel
- Argentières
- Aubepierre-Ozouer-le-Repos
- Beauvoir
- Blandy
- Bois-le-Roi
- Bombon
- Bréau
- Champdeuil
- Champeaux
- La Chapelle-Gauthier
- La Chapelle-Rablais
- Chartrettes
- Châteaubleau
- Le Châtelet-en-Brie
- Châtillon-la-Borde
- Clos-Fontaine
- Courtomer
- Crisenoy
- La Croix-en-Brie
- Échouboulains
- Les Écrennes
- Féricy
- Fontaine-le-Port
- Fontains
- Fontenailles
- Fouju
- Gastins
- Grandpuits-Bailly-Carrois
- Guignes
- Machault
- Moisenay
- Mormant
- Nangis
- Pamfou
- Quiers
- Rampillon
- Saint-Just-en-Brie
- Saint-Méry
- Saint-Ouen-en-Brie
- Sivry-Courtry
- Valence-en-Brie
- Vanvillé
- Verneuil-l'Étang
- Vieux-Champagne
- Yèbles

== See also ==
- Cantons of the Seine-et-Marne department
- Communes of the Seine-et-Marne department
