= Argentières =

- Commune
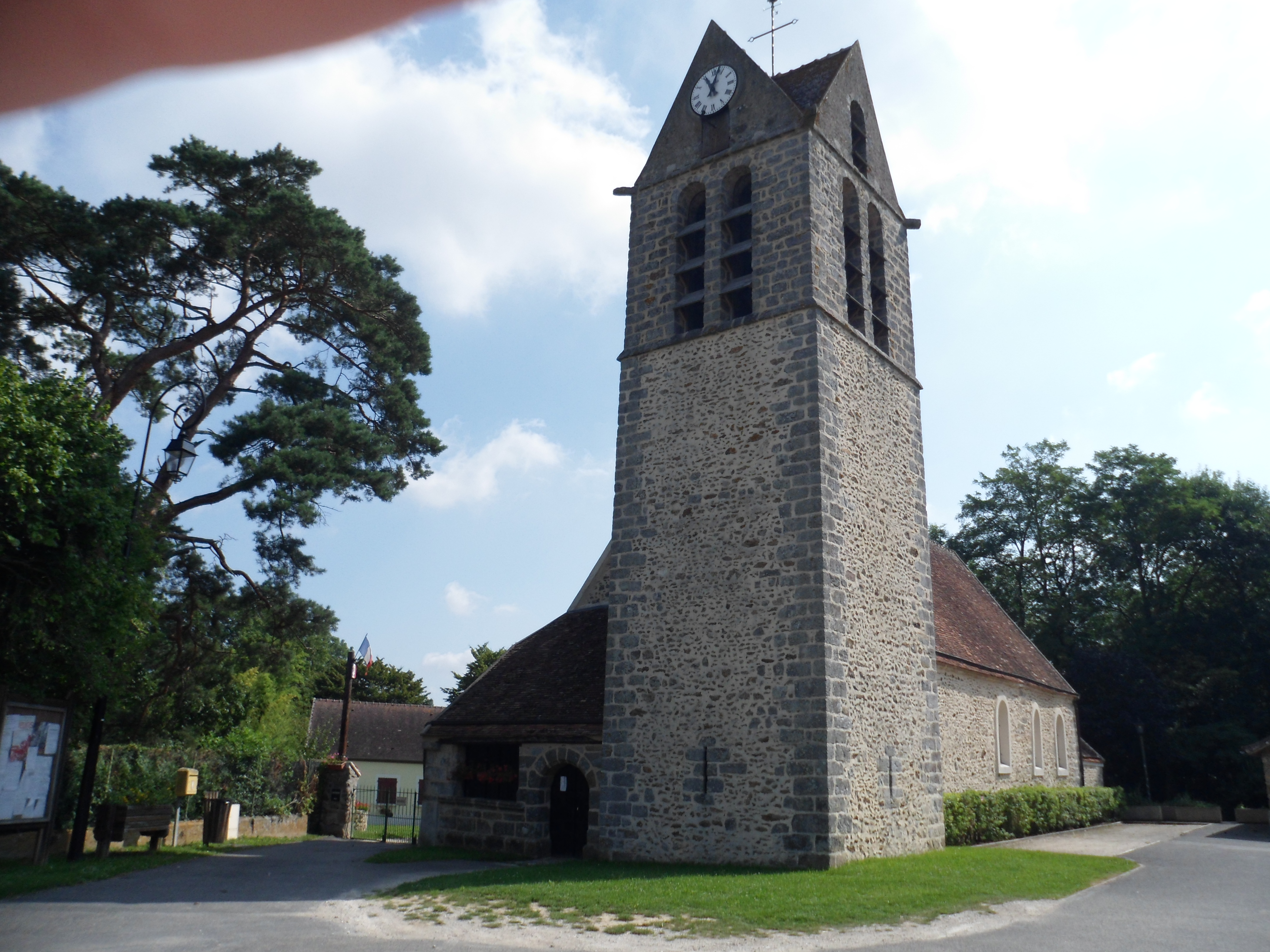
- The church in Argentières

- Coat of arms
- Location of Argentières
- Location within France Location within Île-de-France (region)
- Coordinates: 48°39′15″N 2°52′12″E
- Country: France
- Region: Île-de-France
- Department: Seine-et-Marne
- Arrondissement: Melun
- Canton: Nangis
- Intercommunality: CC Brie Rivières Châteaux

Government
  - Mayor (2020–2026): Patrice Saint-Jalmes
- Area^{1}: 2.57 km^{2} (0.99 sq mi)
- Highest elevation: 107 m (351 ft)
- Lowest elevation: 73 m (240 ft)
- Population (2023): 361
  - Density: 140/km^{2} (364/sq mi)
- Time zone: UTC+01:00 (CET)
  - Summer (DST): UTC+02:00 (CEST)
- INSEE/Postal code: 77007 /77390
- ^{1} French Land Register data, which excludes lakes, ponds, glaciers > 1 km^{2} (0.386 sq mi or 247 acres) and river estuaries.

Argentières (French pronunciation: [aʁʒɑ̃tjɛʁ]) is a commune in the Seine-et-Marne department in the Île-de-France region in north-central France.

== Demographics ==
The inhabitants are called Argentiers.

== See also ==
- Communes of the Seine-et-Marne department
