= Andrezel =

- Commune
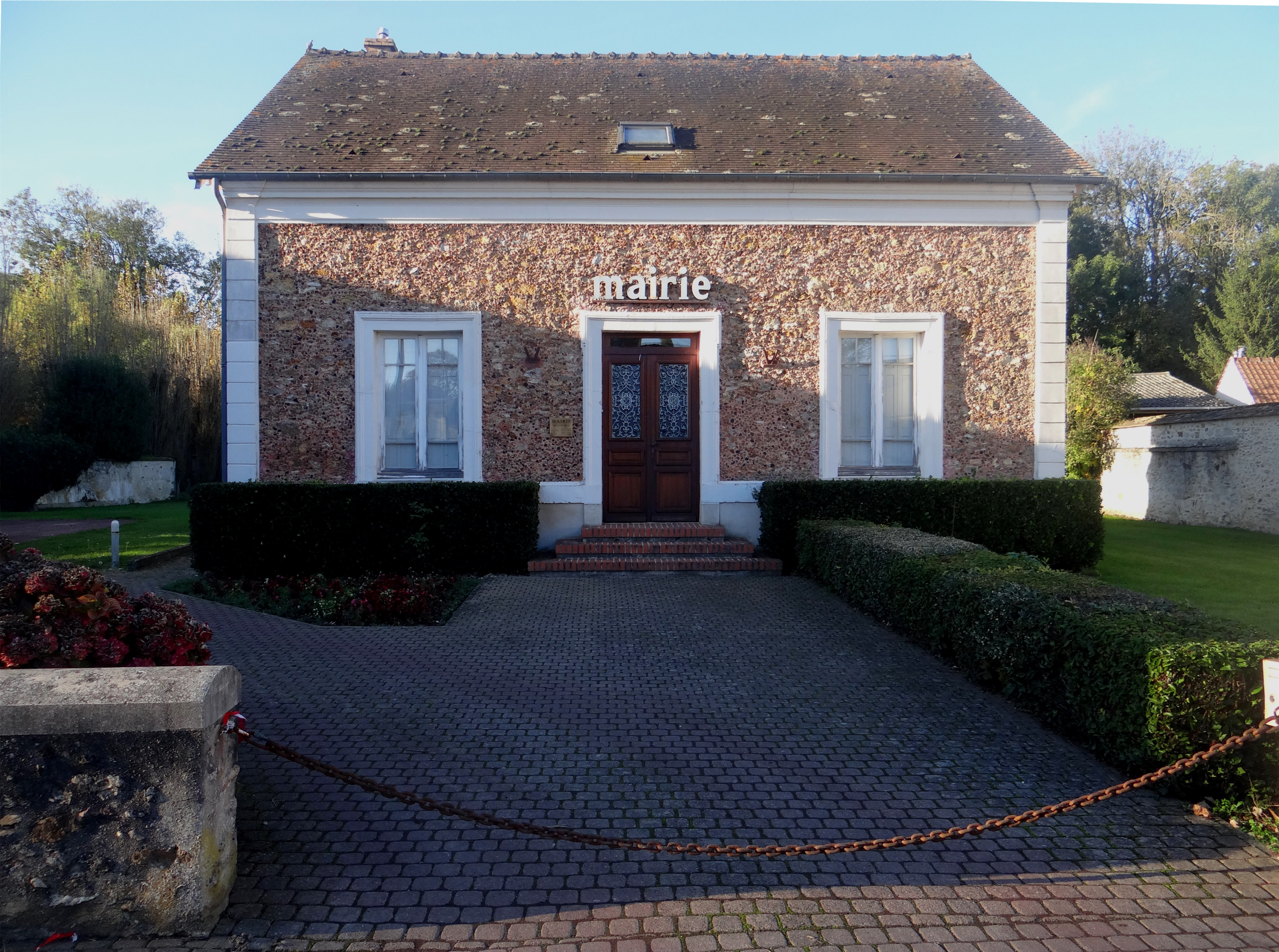
- The town hall in Andrezel

- Coat of arms
- Location of Andrezel
- Location within France Location within Île-de-France (region)
- Coordinates: 48°36′40″N 2°48′49″E
- Country: France
- Region: Île-de-France
- Department: Seine-et-Marne
- Arrondissement: Melun
- Canton: Nangis
- Intercommunality: Brie des Rivières et Châteaux

Government
  - Mayor (2020–2026): Bruno Rémond
- Area^{1}: 8.08 km^{2} (3.12 sq mi)
- Highest elevation: 103 m (338 ft)
- Lowest elevation: 92 m (302 ft)
- Population (2023): 336
  - Density: 41.6/km^{2} (108/sq mi)
- Time zone: UTC+01:00 (CET)
  - Summer (DST): UTC+02:00 (CEST)
- INSEE/Postal code: 77004 /77390
- ^{1} French Land Register data, which excludes lakes, ponds, glaciers > 1 km^{2} (0.386 sq mi or 247 acres) and river estuaries.

Andrezel (French pronunciation: [ɑ̃dʁəzɛl]) is a commune in the Seine-et-Marne department in the Île-de-France region in north-central France.

== History ==
- The Pope Martin IV was born on the territory of Andrezel.

== Demographics ==
The inhabitants are called Andrezeliens.

== Places of interest ==
- Park of the chateau.

== See also ==
- Communes of the Seine-et-Marne department
