= Le Châtelet-en-Brie =

- Commune
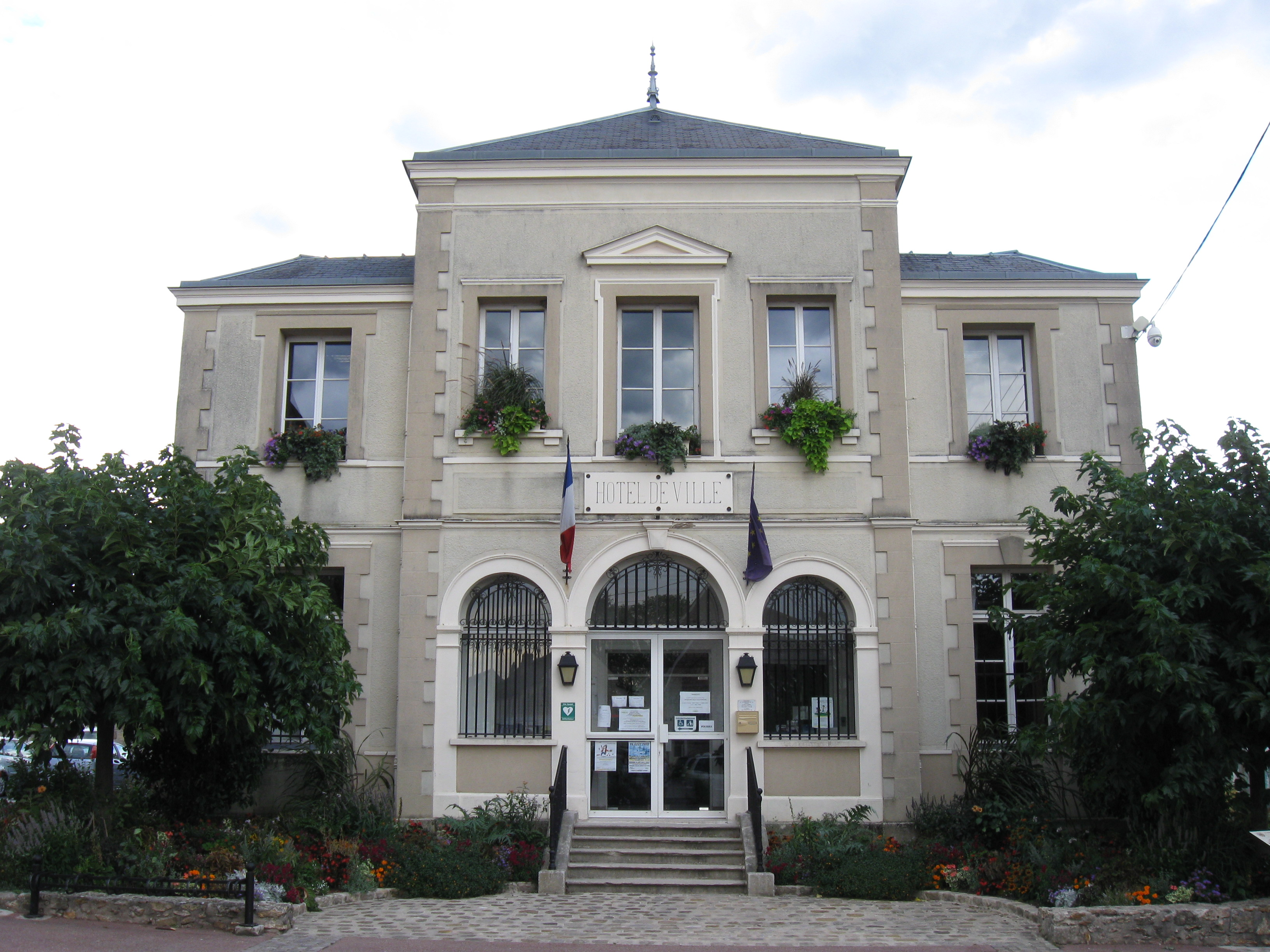
- The town hall in Le Châtelet-en-Brie

- Coat of arms
- Location of Le Châtelet-en-Brie
- Location within France Location within Île-de-France (region)
- Coordinates: 48°30′19″N 2°47′36″E
- Country: France
- Region: Île-de-France
- Department: Seine-et-Marne
- Arrondissement: Melun
- Canton: Nangis
- Intercommunality: CC Brie des Rivières et Châteaux

Government
  - Mayor (2020–2026): Patricia Torcol
- Area^{1}: 22.71 km^{2} (8.77 sq mi)
- Highest elevation: 113 m (371 ft)
- Lowest elevation: 57 m (187 ft)
- Population (2023): 4,207
  - Density: 185.2/km^{2} (479.8/sq mi)
- Time zone: UTC+01:00 (CET)
  - Summer (DST): UTC+02:00 (CEST)
- INSEE/Postal code: 77100 /77820
- ^{1} French Land Register data, which excludes lakes, ponds, glaciers > 1 km^{2} (0.386 sq mi or 247 acres) and river estuaries.

Le Châtelet-en-Brie (French: [lə ʃɑtlɛ ɑ̃ bʁi]) is a commune in the Seine-et-Marne department in the Île-de-France region in north-central France.

== Population ==
Historical population
| Year | Pop. | ±% p.a. |
|---|---|---|
| 1968 | 1,208 | — |
| 1975 | 2,193 | +8.89% |
| 1982 | 3,724 | +7.86% |
| 1990 | 3,980 | +0.83% |
| 1999 | 4,532 | +1.45% |
| 2007 | 4,405 | −0.35% |
| 2012 | 4,401 | −0.02% |
| 2017 | 4,454 | +0.24% |
| 2023 | 4,207 | −0.95% |
Source: INSEE

The inhabitants are called Châtelains in French.

== See also ==
- Communes of the Seine-et-Marne department
