= Valence-en-Brie =

- Commune
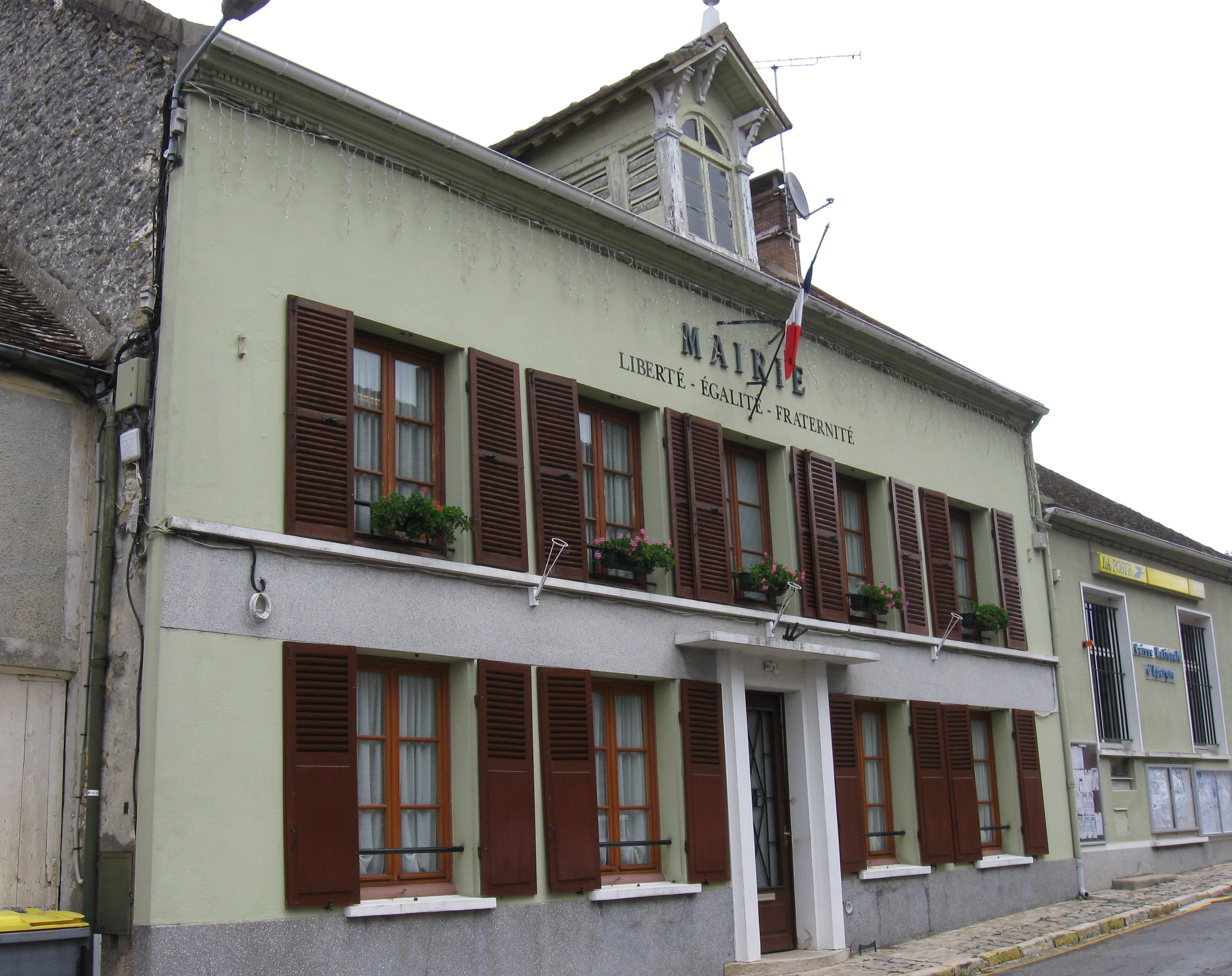
- The town hall in Valence-en-Brie

- Coat of arms
- Location of Valence-en-Brie
- Location within France Location within Île-de-France (region)
- Coordinates: 48°26′39″N 2°53′27″E
- Country: France
- Region: Île-de-France
- Department: Seine-et-Marne
- Arrondissement: Melun
- Canton: Nangis
- Intercommunality: CC Brie des Rivières et Châteaux

Government
  - Mayor (2020–2026): Pierre Racine
- Area^{1}: 11.03 km^{2} (4.26 sq mi)
- Highest elevation: 130 m (430 ft)
- Lowest elevation: 87 m (285 ft)
- Population (2023): 1,007
  - Density: 91.30/km^{2} (236.5/sq mi)
- Time zone: UTC+01:00 (CET)
  - Summer (DST): UTC+02:00 (CEST)
- INSEE/Postal code: 77480 /77830
- ^{1} French Land Register data, which excludes lakes, ponds, glaciers > 1 km^{2} (0.386 sq mi or 247 acres) and river estuaries.

Valence-en-Brie (French pronunciation: [valɑ̃s ɑ̃ bʁi], literally Valence in Brie) is a commune in the Seine-et-Marne department in the Île-de-France region in north-central France.

== Demographics ==
Inhabitants of Valence-en-Brie are called Valençois.

== See also ==
- Communes of the Seine-et-Marne department
