= Châtillon-la-Borde =

- Commune
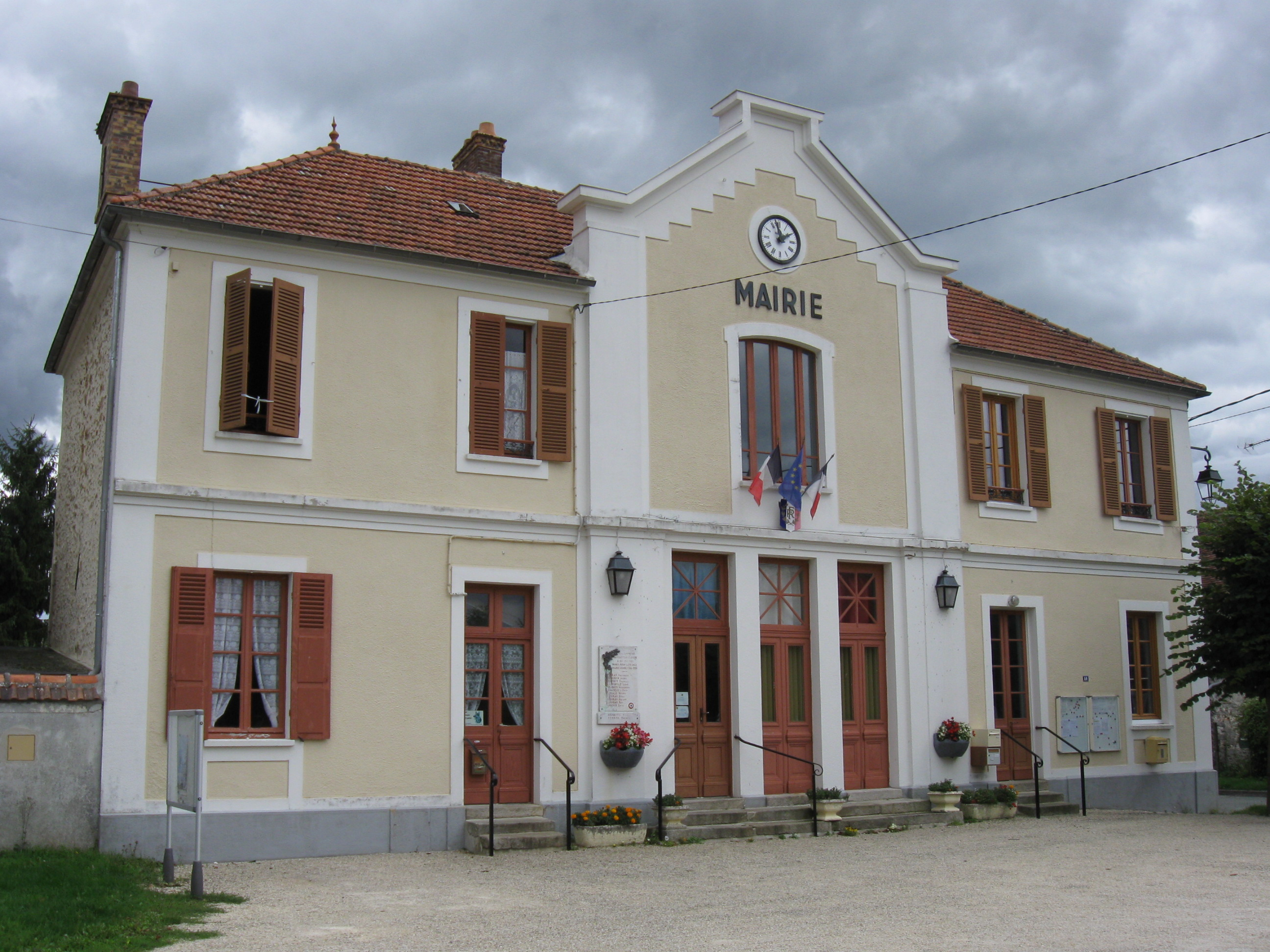
- The town hall in Châtillon-la-Borde
- Location of Châtillon-la-Borde
- Location within France Location within Île-de-France (region)
- Coordinates: 48°32′33″N 2°48′26″E
- Country: France
- Region: Île-de-France
- Department: Seine-et-Marne
- Arrondissement: Melun
- Canton: Nangis
- Intercommunality: CC Brie des Rivières et Châteaux

Government
  - Mayor (2020–2026): Hubert Caseaux
- Area^{1}: 7.25 km^{2} (2.80 sq mi)
- Highest elevation: 116 m (381 ft)
- Lowest elevation: 86 m (282 ft)
- Population (2023): 226
  - Density: 31.2/km^{2} (80.7/sq mi)
- Time zone: UTC+01:00 (CET)
  - Summer (DST): UTC+02:00 (CEST)
- INSEE/Postal code: 77103 /77820
- ^{1} French Land Register data, which excludes lakes, ponds, glaciers > 1 km^{2} (0.386 sq mi or 247 acres) and river estuaries.

Châtillon-la-Borde (French pronunciation: [ʃatijɔ̃ la bɔʁd]) is a commune in the Seine-et-Marne department in the Île-de-France region in north-central France.

== Demographics ==
The inhabitants are called Châtillonais-Labordillois.

== See also ==
- Communes of the Seine-et-Marne department
