= Yèbles =

- Commune
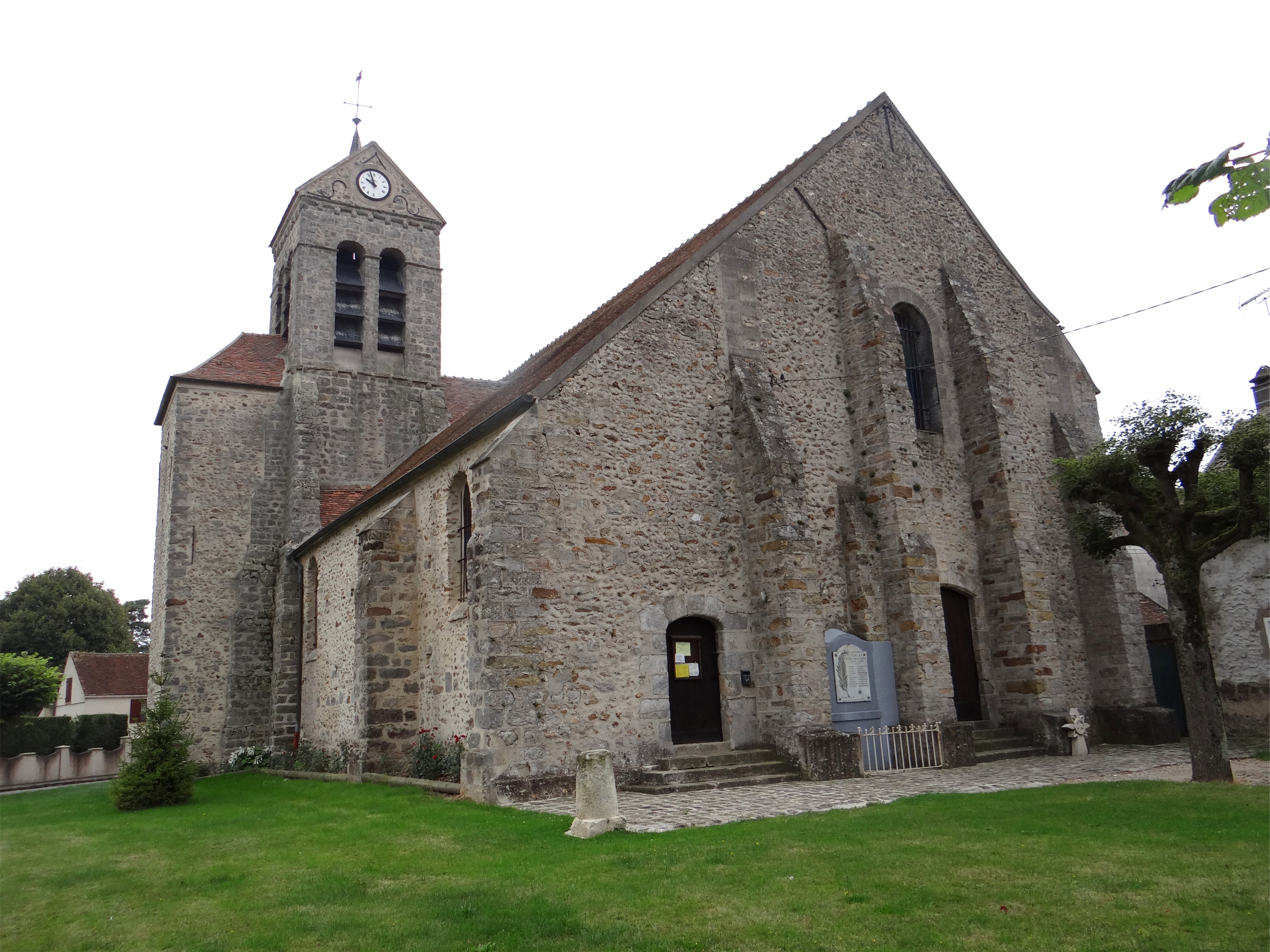
- The church in Yèbles
- Location of Yèbles
- Location within France Location within Île-de-France (region)
- Coordinates: 48°38′17″N 2°46′18″E
- Country: France
- Region: Île-de-France
- Department: Seine-et-Marne
- Arrondissement: Melun
- Canton: Nangis
- Intercommunality: Brie des Rivières et Châteaux

Government
  - Mayor (2020–2026): Marième Tamata-Varin
- Area^{1}: 11.58 km^{2} (4.47 sq mi)
- Highest elevation: 106 m (348 ft)
- Lowest elevation: 62 m (203 ft)
- Population (2023): 980
  - Density: 85/km^{2} (220/sq mi)
- Time zone: UTC+01:00 (CET)
  - Summer (DST): UTC+02:00 (CEST)
- INSEE/Postal code: 77534 /77390
- ^{1} French Land Register data, which excludes lakes, ponds, glaciers > 1 km^{2} (0.386 sq mi or 247 acres) and river estuaries.

Yèbles (French pronunciation: [jɛbl]) is a commune in the Seine-et-Marne department in the Île-de-France region in north-central France.

== Population ==
Inhabitants of Yèbles are called Ebuliens in French.

Historical population
Year	Pop.	±% p.a.
1968	259	—
1975	287	+1.48%
1982	401	+4.89%
1990	553	+4.10%
1999	558	+0.10%
2007	593	+0.76%
2012	662	+2.23%
2017	960	+7.72%
2023	980	+0.34%
Source: INSEE

== See also ==
- Communes of the Seine-et-Marne department
