= Les Écrennes =

- Commune
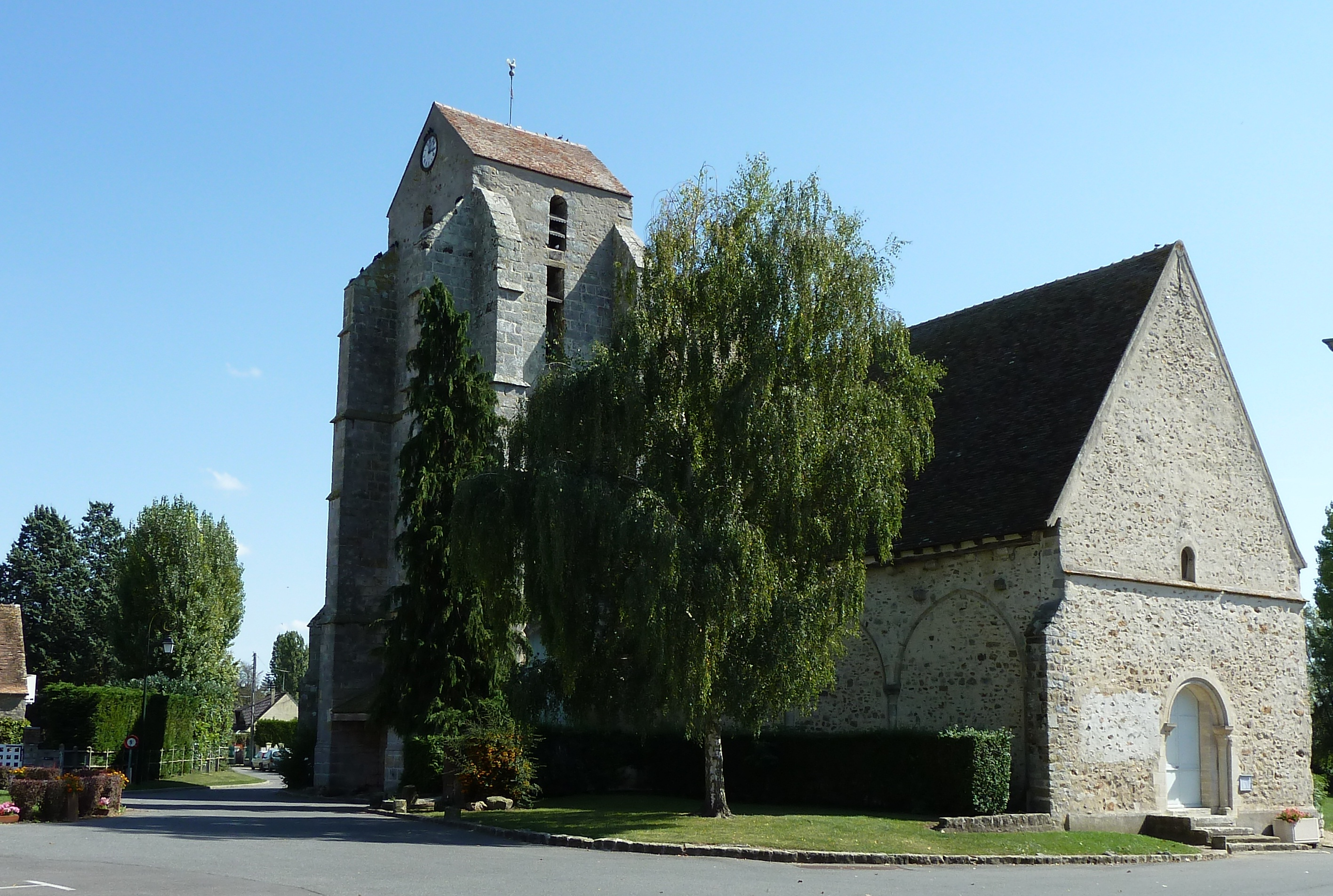
- The church in Les Écrennes

- Coat of arms
- Location of Les Écrennes
- Location within France Location within Île-de-France (region)
- Coordinates: 48°30′00″N 2°51′00″E
- Country: France
- Region: Île-de-France
- Department: Seine-et-Marne
- Arrondissement: Melun
- Canton: Nangis
- Intercommunality: CC Brie des Rivières et Châteaux

Government
  - Mayor (2020–2026): Gilles Nestel
- Area^{1}: 18.54 km^{2} (7.16 sq mi)
- Highest elevation: 130 m (430 ft)
- Lowest elevation: 96 m (315 ft)
- Population (2023): 628
  - Density: 33.9/km^{2} (87.7/sq mi)
- Time zone: UTC+01:00 (CET)
  - Summer (DST): UTC+02:00 (CEST)
- INSEE/Postal code: 77165 /77820
- ^{1} French Land Register data, which excludes lakes, ponds, glaciers > 1 km^{2} (0.386 sq mi or 247 acres) and river estuaries.

Les Écrennes (French pronunciation: [le.z‿ekʁɛn]) is a commune in the Seine-et-Marne département in the Île-de-France region in north-central France.

== Demographics ==
Inhabitants of Les Écrennes are called Écrennois.

== See also ==
- Communes of the Seine-et-Marne department
