= Beauvoir, Seine-et-Marne =

Beauvoir
- Commune
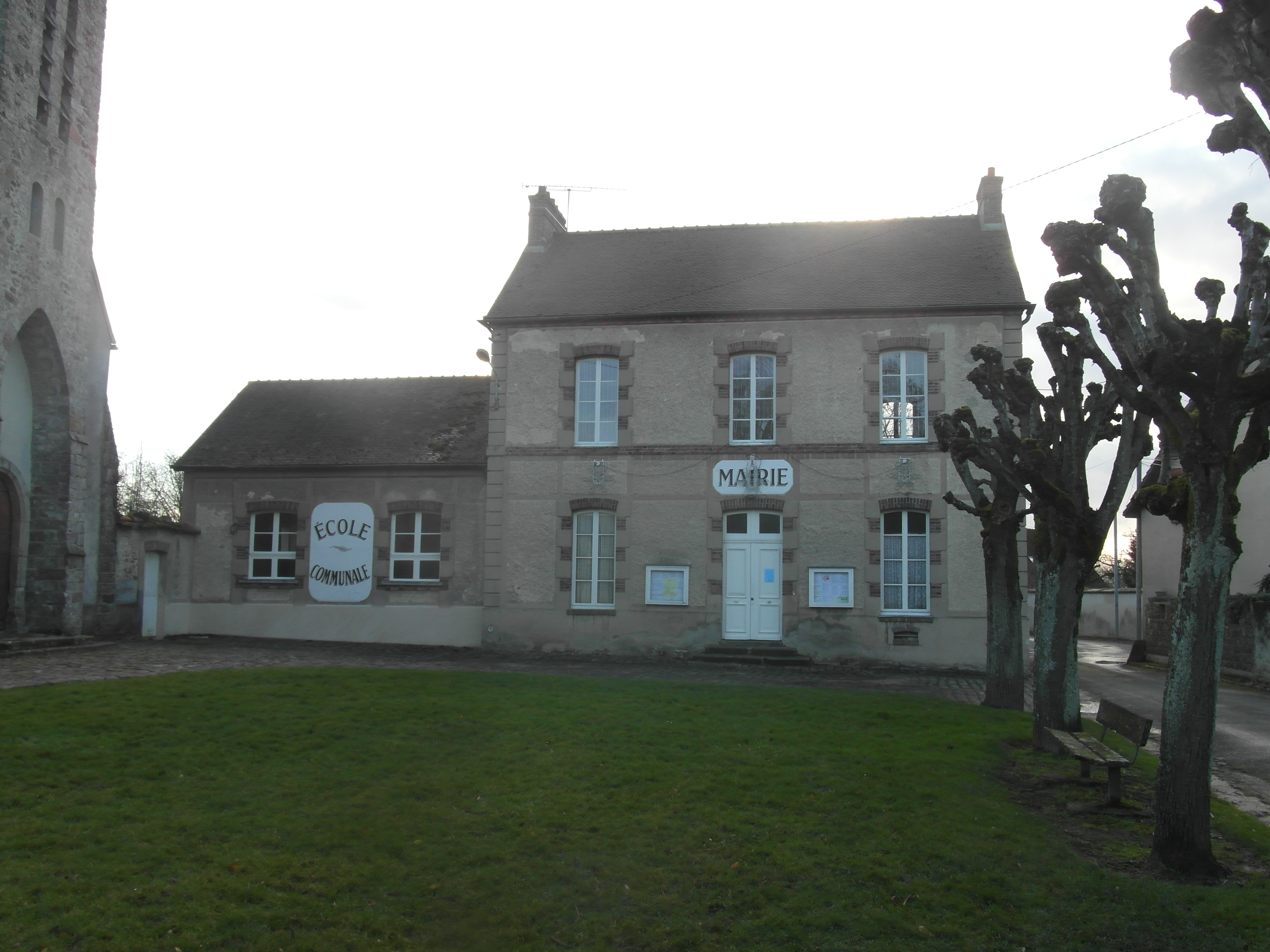
- The town hall in Beauvoir
- Location of Beauvoir
- Location within France Location within Île-de-France (region)
- Coordinates: 48°38′43″N 2°51′51″E
- Country: France
- Region: Île-de-France
- Department: Seine-et-Marne
- Arrondissement: Melun
- Canton: Nangis
- Intercommunality: CC Brie des Rivières et Châteaux

Government
  - Mayor (2020–2026): Patricia Casier
- Area^{1}: 3.94 km^{2} (1.52 sq mi)
- Highest elevation: 114 m (374 ft)
- Lowest elevation: 85 m (279 ft)
- Population (2023): 185
  - Density: 47.0/km^{2} (122/sq mi)
- Time zone: UTC+01:00 (CET)
  - Summer (DST): UTC+02:00 (CEST)
- INSEE/Postal code: 77029 /77390
- ^{1} French Land Register data, which excludes lakes, ponds, glaciers > 1 km^{2} (0.386 sq mi or 247 acres) and river estuaries.

Beauvoir (French pronunciation: [bovwaʁ]) is a commune in the Seine-et-Marne department in the Île-de-France region in north-central France.

== See also ==
- Communes of the Seine-et-Marne department
