= Guignes =

- Commune
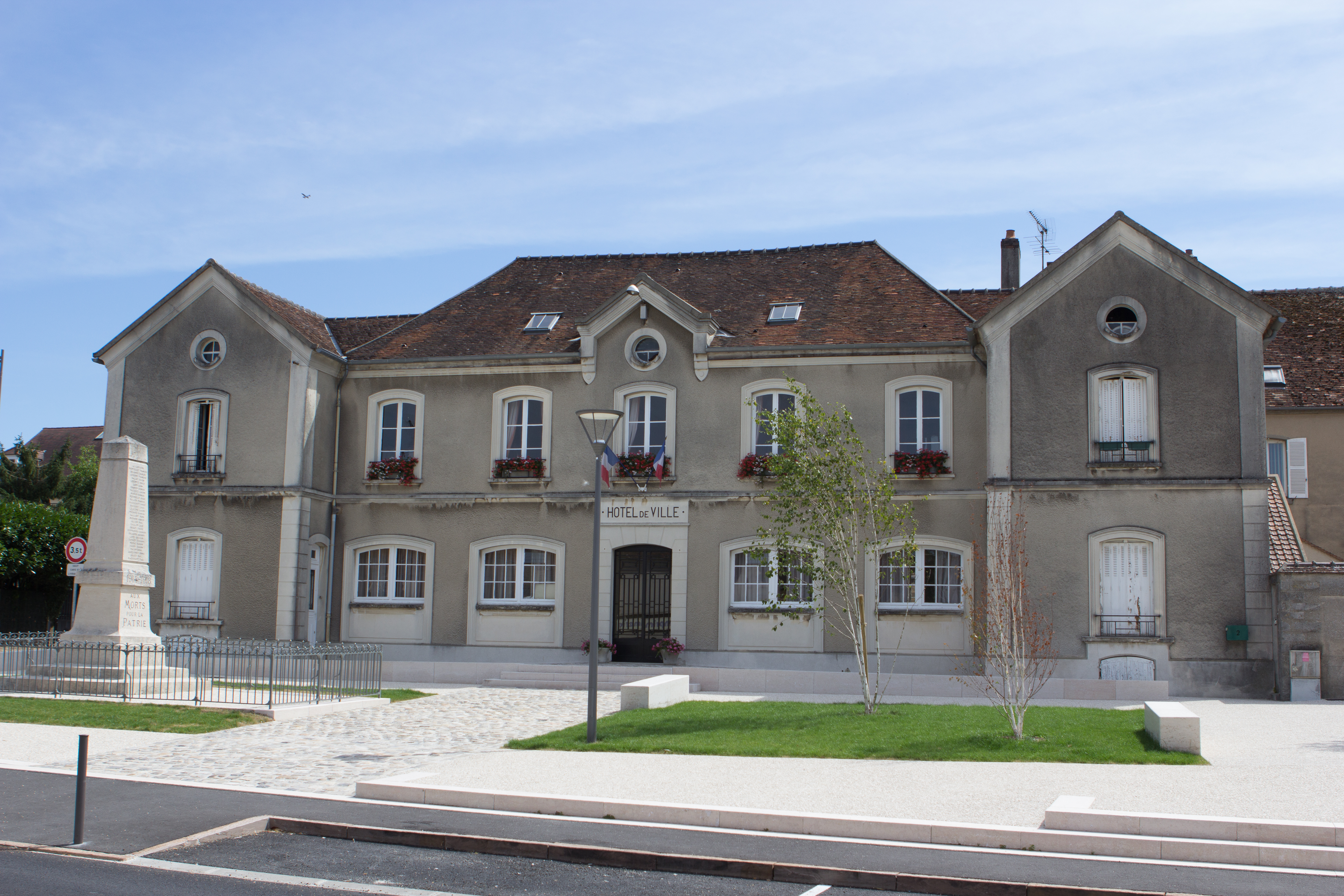
- The town hall in Guignes

- Coat of arms
- Location of Guignes
- Location within France Location within Île-de-France (region)
- Coordinates: 48°38′11″N 2°47′59″E
- Country: France
- Region: Île-de-France
- Department: Seine-et-Marne
- Arrondissement: Melun
- Canton: Nangis
- Intercommunality: CC Brie des Rivières et Châteaux

Government
  - Mayor (2023–2026): Manuel Medeiros
- Area^{1}: 5.68 km^{2} (2.19 sq mi)
- Highest elevation: 107 m (351 ft)
- Lowest elevation: 73 m (240 ft)
- Population (2023): 4,448
  - Density: 783/km^{2} (2,030/sq mi)
- Time zone: UTC+01:00 (CET)
  - Summer (DST): UTC+02:00 (CEST)
- INSEE/Postal code: 77222 /77390
- ^{1} French Land Register data, which excludes lakes, ponds, glaciers > 1 km^{2} (0.386 sq mi or 247 acres) and river estuaries.

Guignes (French pronunciation: [ɡiɲ]) is a commune in the Seine-et-Marne département in the Île-de-France region in north-central France.

== Population ==
Historical population
| Year | Pop. | ±% p.a. |
|---|---|---|
| 1968 | 1,514 | — |
| 1975 | 1,687 | +1.56% |
| 1982 | 1,978 | +2.30% |
| 1990 | 2,285 | +1.82% |
| 1999 | 2,412 | +0.60% |
| 2007 | 3,043 | +2.95% |
| 2012 | 3,361 | +2.01% |
| 2017 | 4,095 | +4.03% |
| 2023 | 4,448 | +1.39% |
Source: INSEE

Inhabitants are called Guignois in French.

== See also ==
- Communes of the Seine-et-Marne department
