= Fontaine-le-Port =

- Commune
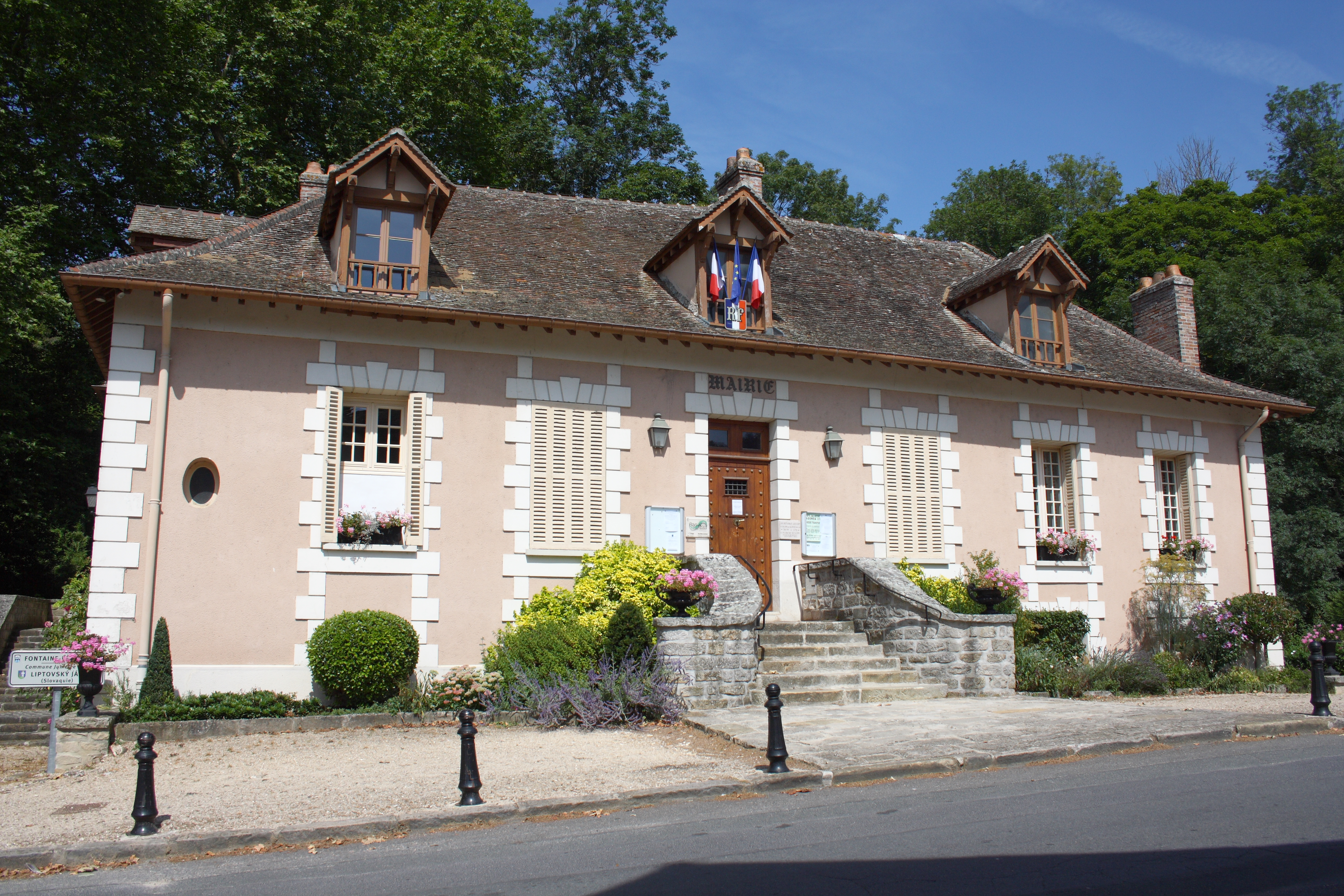
- The town hall in Fontaine-le-Port

- Coat of arms
- Location of Fontaine-le-Port
- Location within France Location within Île-de-France (region)
- Coordinates: 48°29′10″N 2°45′50″E
- Country: France
- Region: Île-de-France
- Department: Seine-et-Marne
- Arrondissement: Melun
- Canton: Nangis
- Intercommunality: CC Brie des Rivières et Châteaux

Government
  - Mayor (2020–2026): Béatrice Mothré
- Area^{1}: 7.89 km^{2} (3.05 sq mi)
- Highest elevation: 97 m (318 ft)
- Lowest elevation: 41 m (135 ft)
- Population (2023): 1,025
  - Density: 130/km^{2} (336/sq mi)
- Time zone: UTC+01:00 (CET)
  - Summer (DST): UTC+02:00 (CEST)
- INSEE/Postal code: 77188 /77590
- ^{1} French Land Register data, which excludes lakes, ponds, glaciers > 1 km^{2} (0.386 sq mi or 247 acres) and river estuaries.

Fontaine-le-Port (French pronunciation: [fɔ̃tɛn lə pɔʁ]) is a commune in the Seine-et-Marne department in the Île-de-France region in north-central France.

== Demographics ==
Fontaine-le-Port has a population of approximately 800. Inhabitants of Fontaine-le-Port are called Portifontains. There is a train station with trains direct to Gare de Lyon (Paris) during peak times and with a connection in Melun on off-peak times. Fontaine Le Port has a primary school as well as a bakery and borders the Seine with a view of the Fontainebleau Forest. The former Barbeau Abbey, dissolved in the French Revolution, was sited here.

== See also ==
- Communes of the Seine-et-Marne department
