= Machault, Seine-et-Marne =

Machault
- Commune
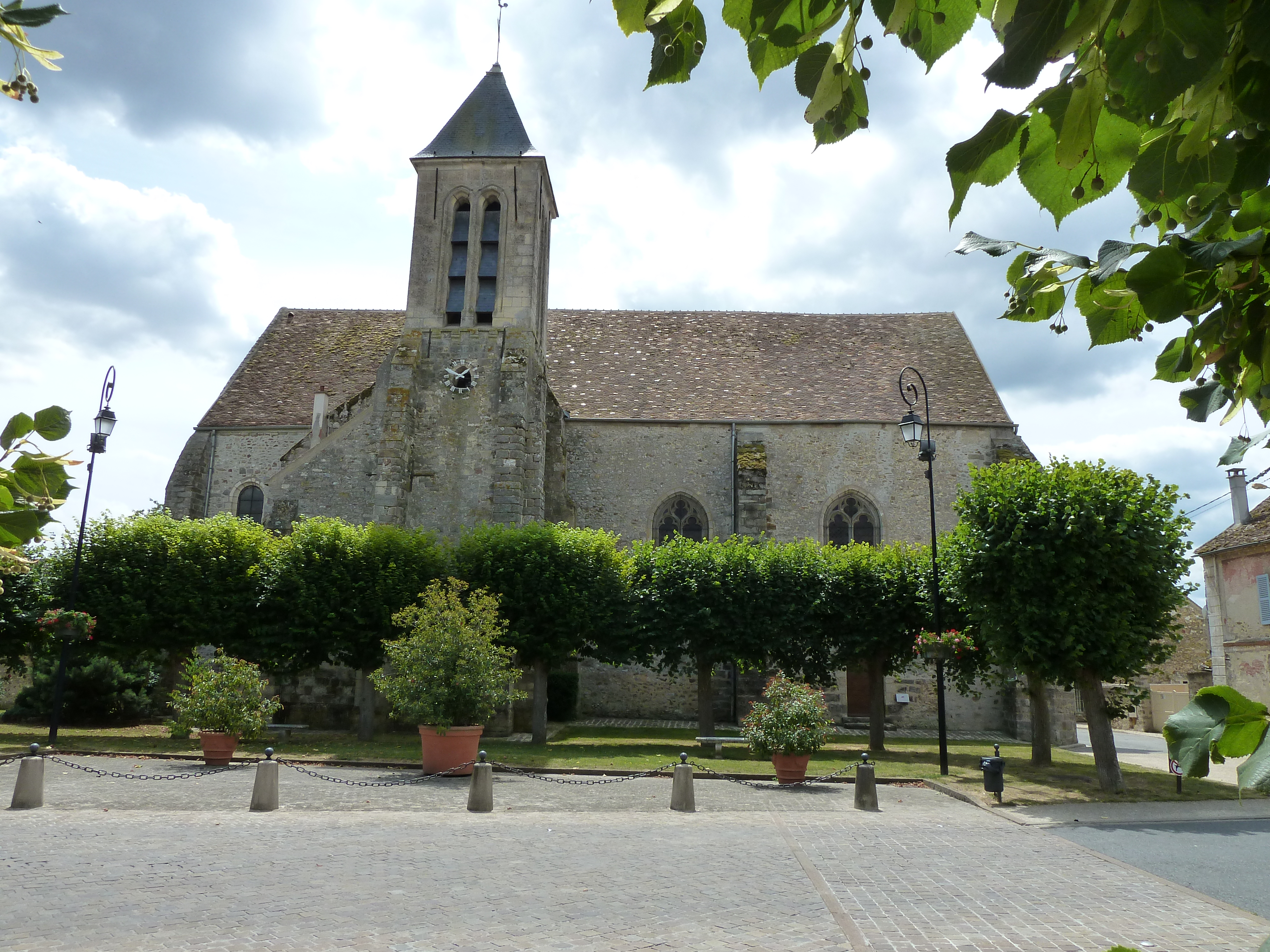
- The church in Machault

- Coat of arms
- Location of Machault
- Location within France Location within Île-de-France (region)
- Coordinates: 48°27′19″N 2°49′49″E
- Country: France
- Region: Île-de-France
- Department: Seine-et-Marne
- Arrondissement: Melun
- Canton: Nangis
- Intercommunality: Brie des Rivières et Châteaux

Government
  - Mayor (2020–2026): Christian Poteau
- Area^{1}: 16.28 km^{2} (6.29 sq mi)
- Highest elevation: 117 m (384 ft)
- Lowest elevation: 72 m (236 ft)
- Population (2023): 815
  - Density: 50.1/km^{2} (130/sq mi)
- Time zone: UTC+01:00 (CET)
  - Summer (DST): UTC+02:00 (CEST)
- INSEE/Postal code: 77266 /77133
- ^{1} French Land Register data, which excludes lakes, ponds, glaciers > 1 km^{2} (0.386 sq mi or 247 acres) and river estuaries.

Machault (French pronunciation: [maʃo]) is a commune in the Seine-et-Marne département in the Île-de-France region in north-central France.

== Population ==
Inhabitants are called Machauliens in French.

Historical population
Year	Pop.	±% p.a.
1968	316	—
1975	305	−0.50%
1982	367	+2.68%
1990	538	+4.90%
1999	634	+1.84%
2007	694	+1.14%
2012	755	+1.70%
2017	783	+0.73%
2023	815	+0.67%
Source: INSEE

== See also ==
- Communes of the Seine-et-Marne department
