= Champeaux, Seine-et-Marne =

Champeaux
- Commune
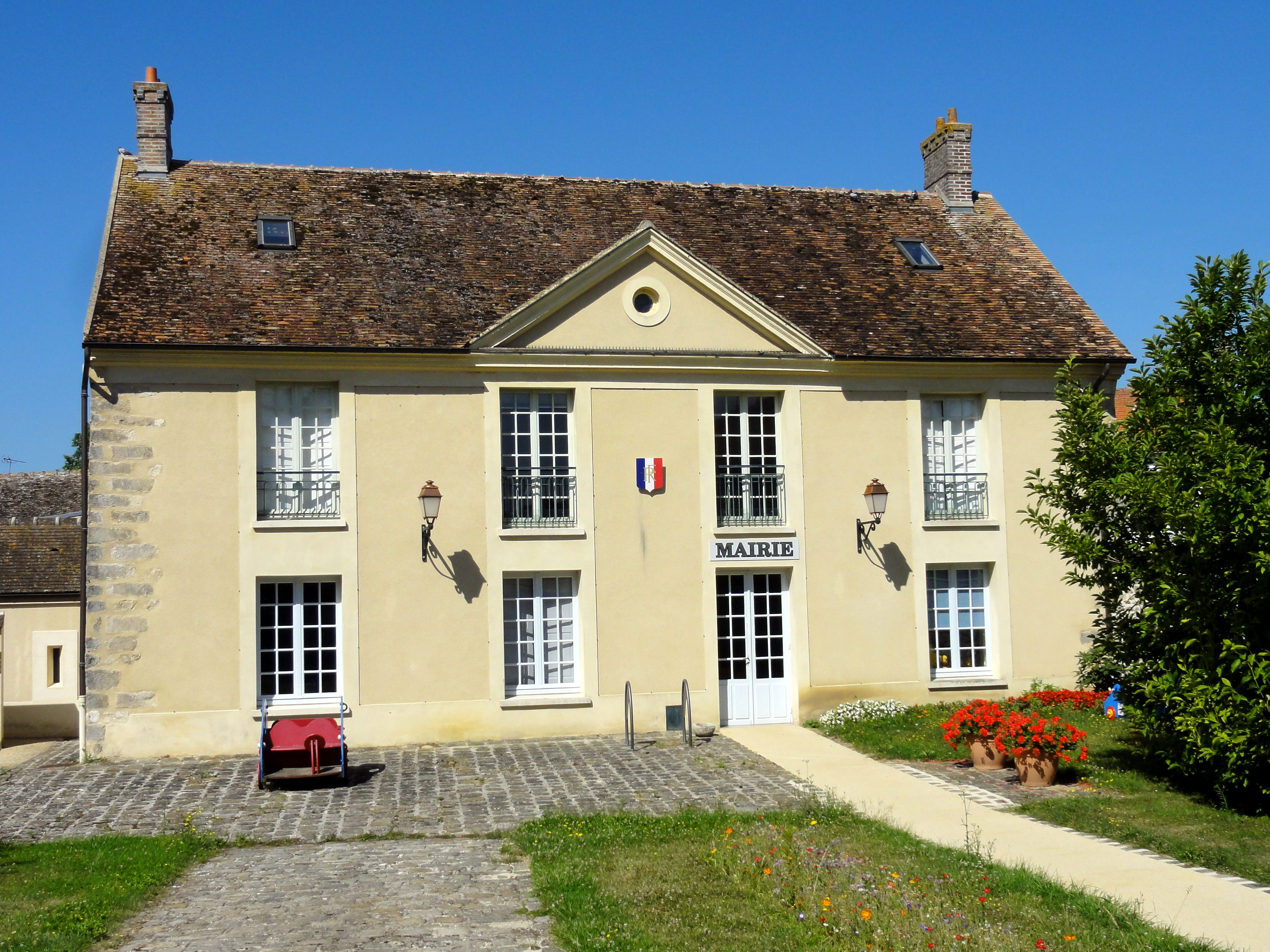
- The town hall in Champeaux

- Coat of arms
- Location of Champeaux
- Location within France Location within Île-de-France (region)
- Coordinates: 48°35′09″N 2°48′28″E
- Country: France
- Region: Île-de-France
- Department: Seine-et-Marne
- Arrondissement: Melun
- Canton: Nangis
- Intercommunality: CC Brie des Rivières et Châteaux

Government
  - Mayor (2020–2026): Yves Lagües-Baget
- Area^{1}: 10.35 km^{2} (4.00 sq mi)
- Highest elevation: 104 m (341 ft)
- Lowest elevation: 71 m (233 ft)
- Population (2023): 810
  - Density: 78/km^{2} (200/sq mi)
- Time zone: UTC+01:00 (CET)
  - Summer (DST): UTC+02:00 (CEST)
- INSEE/Postal code: 77082 /77720
- ^{1} French Land Register data, which excludes lakes, ponds, glaciers > 1 km^{2} (0.386 sq mi or 247 acres) and river estuaries.

Champeaux (French pronunciation: [ʃɑ̃po]) is a commune in the Seine-et-Marne department in the Île-de-France region in north-central France.

Birhplace of William of Champeaux, canon of the cathedral of Notre-Dame.

== Demographics ==
The inhabitants are called Campéliens.

== See also ==
- Communes of the Seine-et-Marne department
