= Bombon, Seine-et-Marne =

Bombon
- Commune
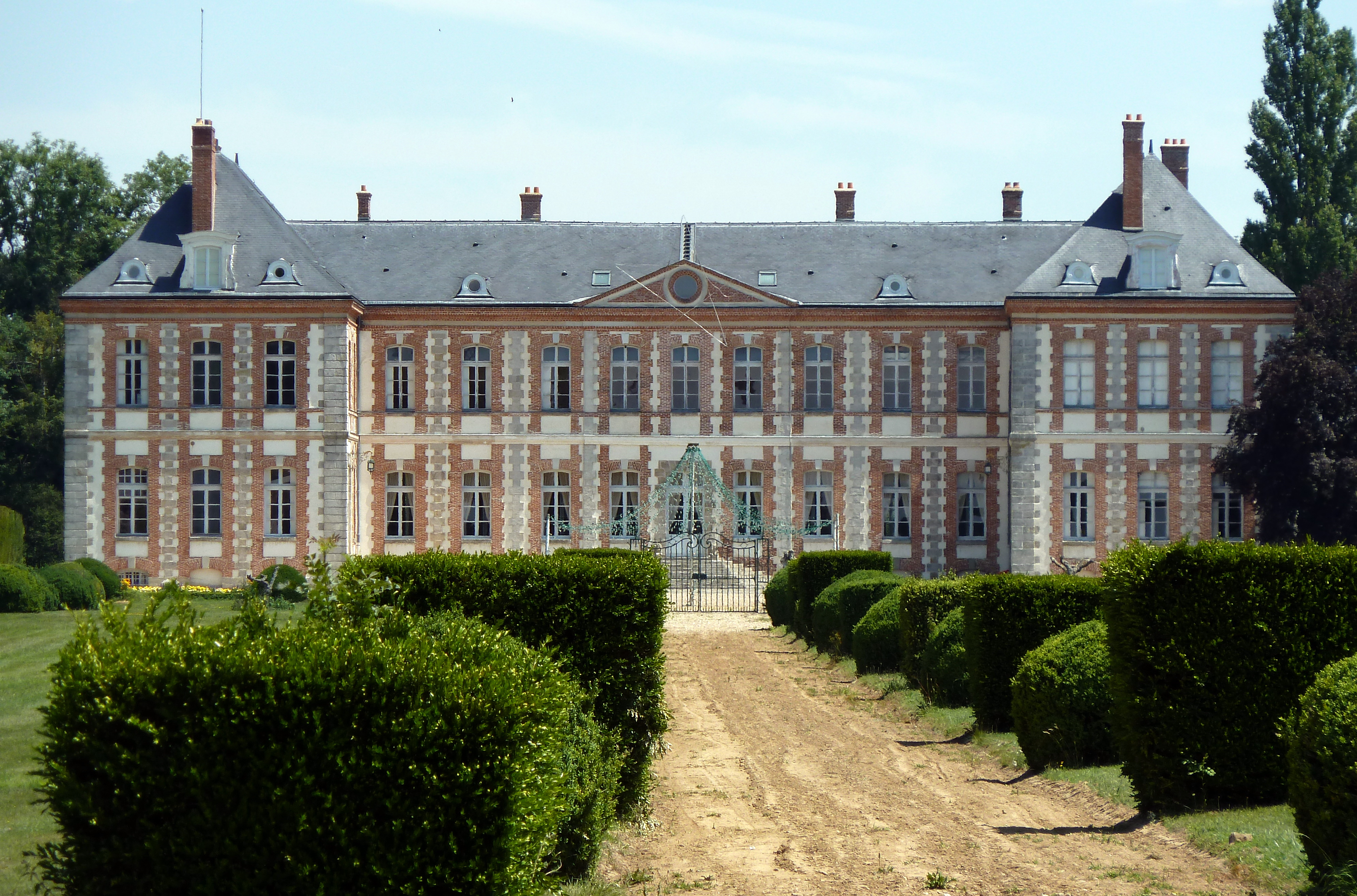
- The chateau in Bombon

- Coat of arms
- Location of Bombon
- Location within France Location within Île-de-France (region)
- Coordinates: 48°34′21″N 2°51′36″E
- Country: France
- Region: Île-de-France
- Department: Seine-et-Marne
- Arrondissement: Melun
- Canton: Nangis
- Intercommunality: CC Brie des Rivières et Châteaux

Government
  - Mayor (2020–2026): Joëlle Salazar
- Area^{1}: 15.01 km^{2} (5.80 sq mi)
- Highest elevation: 122 m (400 ft)
- Lowest elevation: 78 m (256 ft)
- Population (2023): 935
  - Density: 62.3/km^{2} (161/sq mi)
- Time zone: UTC+01:00 (CET)
  - Summer (DST): UTC+02:00 (CEST)
- INSEE/Postal code: 77044 /77720
- ^{1} French Land Register data, which excludes lakes, ponds, glaciers > 1 km^{2} (0.386 sq mi or 247 acres) and river estuaries.

Bombon (French pronunciation: [bɔ̃bɔ̃]) is a commune in the Seine-et-Marne department in the Île-de-France region in north-central France.

== Demographics ==
The inhabitants are called Bombonnais.

== See also ==
- Communes of the Seine-et-Marne department
