= Sivry-Courtry =

- Commune
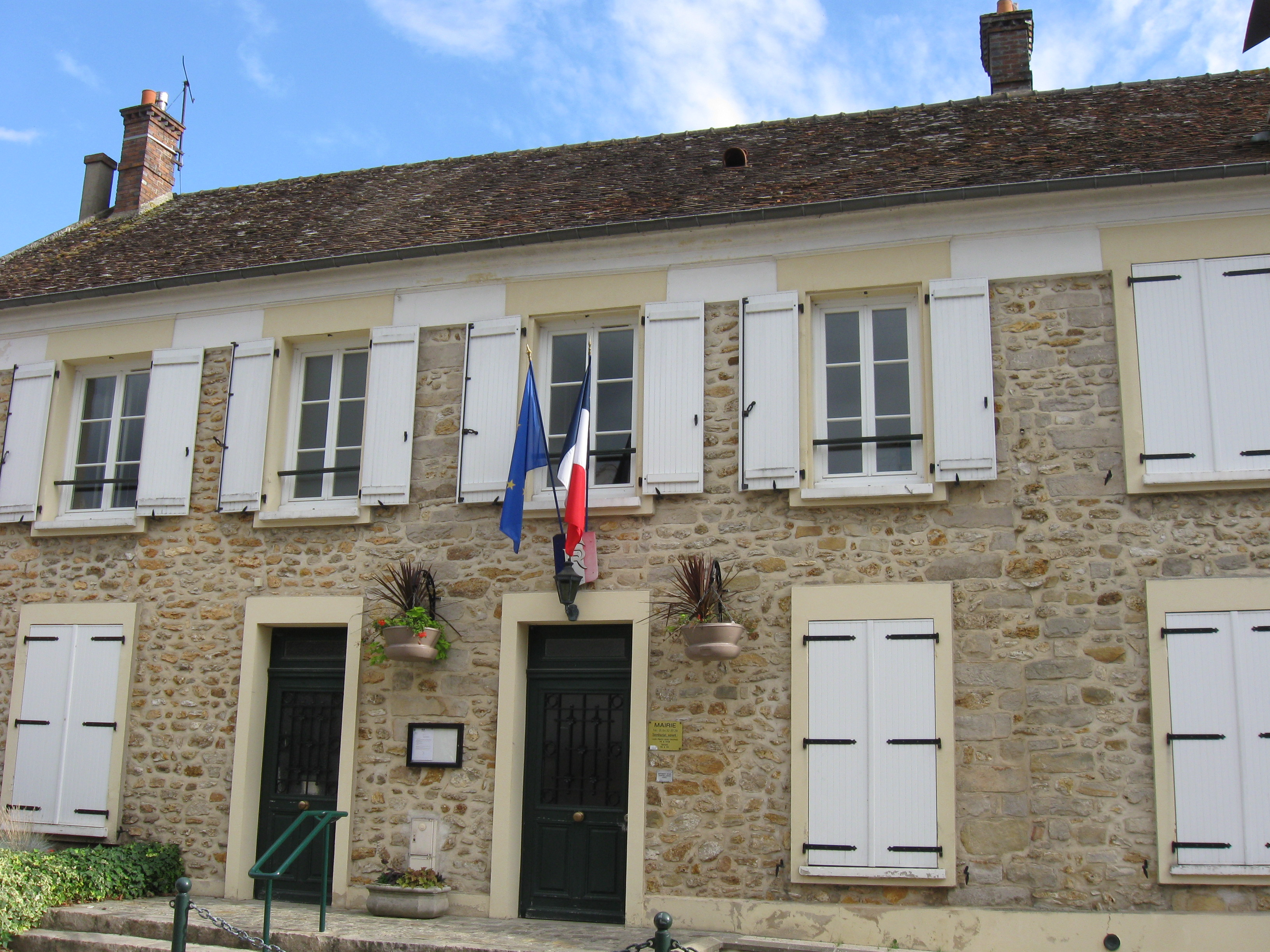
- The town hall in Sivry-Courtry
- Location of Sivry-Courtry
- Location within France Location within Île-de-France (region)
- Coordinates: 48°31′43″N 2°45′21″E
- Country: France
- Region: Île-de-France
- Department: Seine-et-Marne
- Arrondissement: Melun
- Canton: Nangis
- Intercommunality: CC Brie des Rivières et Châteaux

Government
  - Mayor (2020–2026): Aline Hellias
- Area^{1}: 22.47 km^{2} (8.68 sq mi)
- Highest elevation: 104 m (341 ft)
- Lowest elevation: 73 m (240 ft)
- Population (2023): 1,124
  - Density: 50.02/km^{2} (129.6/sq mi)
- Time zone: UTC+01:00 (CET)
  - Summer (DST): UTC+02:00 (CEST)
- INSEE/Postal code: 77453 /77115
- ^{1} French Land Register data, which excludes lakes, ponds, glaciers > 1 km^{2} (0.386 sq mi or 247 acres) and river estuaries.

Sivry-Courtry (French pronunciation: [sivʁi kuʁtʁi]) is a commune in the Seine-et-Marne department in the Île-de-France region in north-central France.

== Demographics ==
Inhabitants of Sivry-Courtry are called Sivryens.

== See also ==
- Communes of the Seine-et-Marne department
