= Moisenay =

- Commune
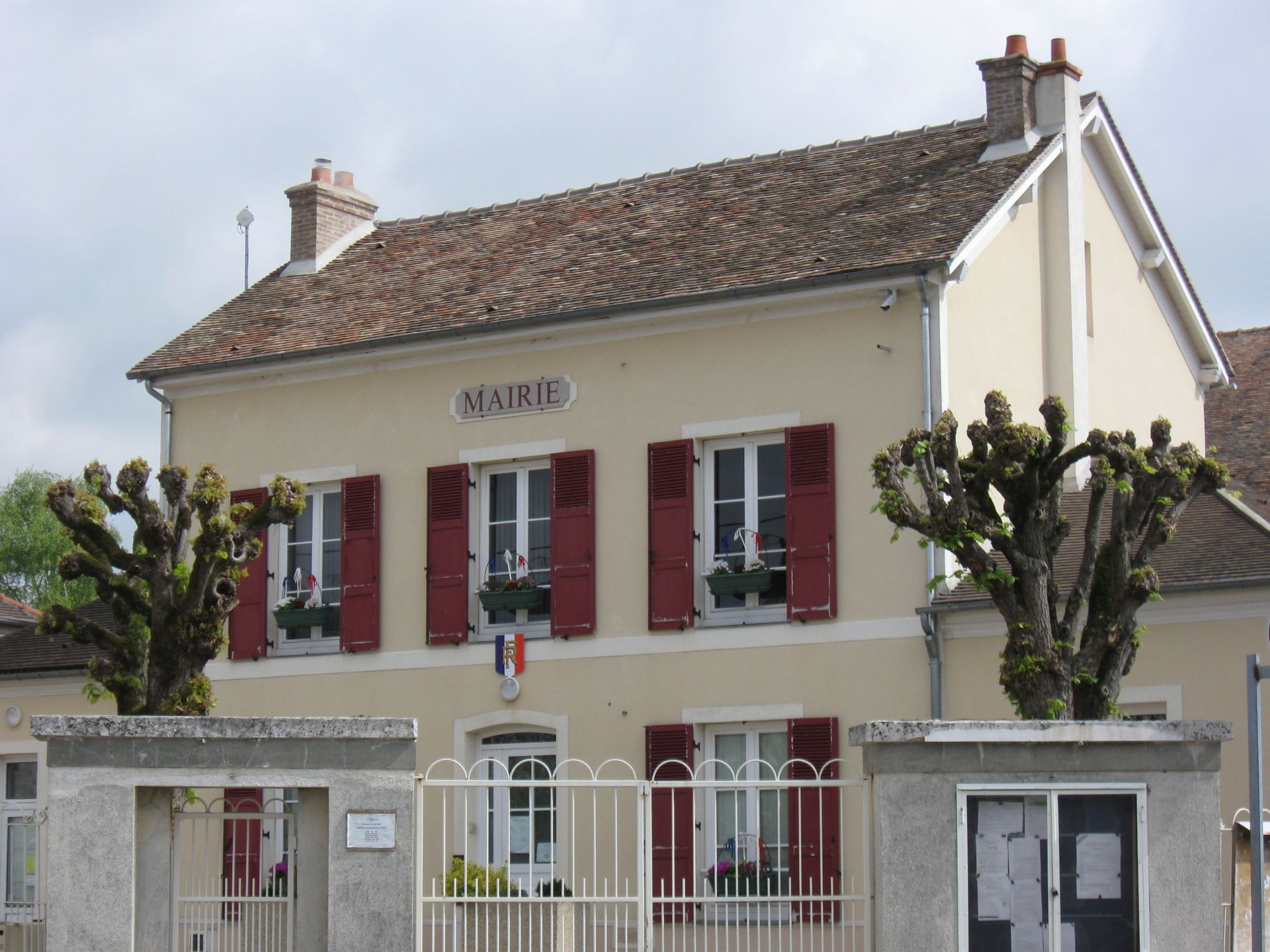
- The town hall in Moisenay
- Location of Moisenay
- Location within France Location within Île-de-France (region)
- Coordinates: 48°33′46″N 2°44′10″E
- Country: France
- Region: Île-de-France
- Department: Seine-et-Marne
- Arrondissement: Melun
- Canton: Nangis
- Intercommunality: CC Brie des Rivières et Châteaux

Government
  - Mayor (2020–2026): Geneviève Varoqui
- Area^{1}: 8.72 km^{2} (3.37 sq mi)
- Highest elevation: 92 m (302 ft)
- Lowest elevation: 53 m (174 ft)
- Population (2023): 1,362
  - Density: 156/km^{2} (405/sq mi)
- Time zone: UTC+01:00 (CET)
  - Summer (DST): UTC+02:00 (CEST)
- INSEE/Postal code: 77295 /77950
- ^{1} French Land Register data, which excludes lakes, ponds, glaciers > 1 km^{2} (0.386 sq mi or 247 acres) and river estuaries.

Moisenay (French pronunciation: [mwaznɛ]) is a commune in the Seine-et-Marne department in the Île-de-France region in north-central France.

== Demographics ==
Inhabitants are called Moseniens.

== See also ==
- Communes of the Seine-et-Marne department
