= Pamfou =

- Commune
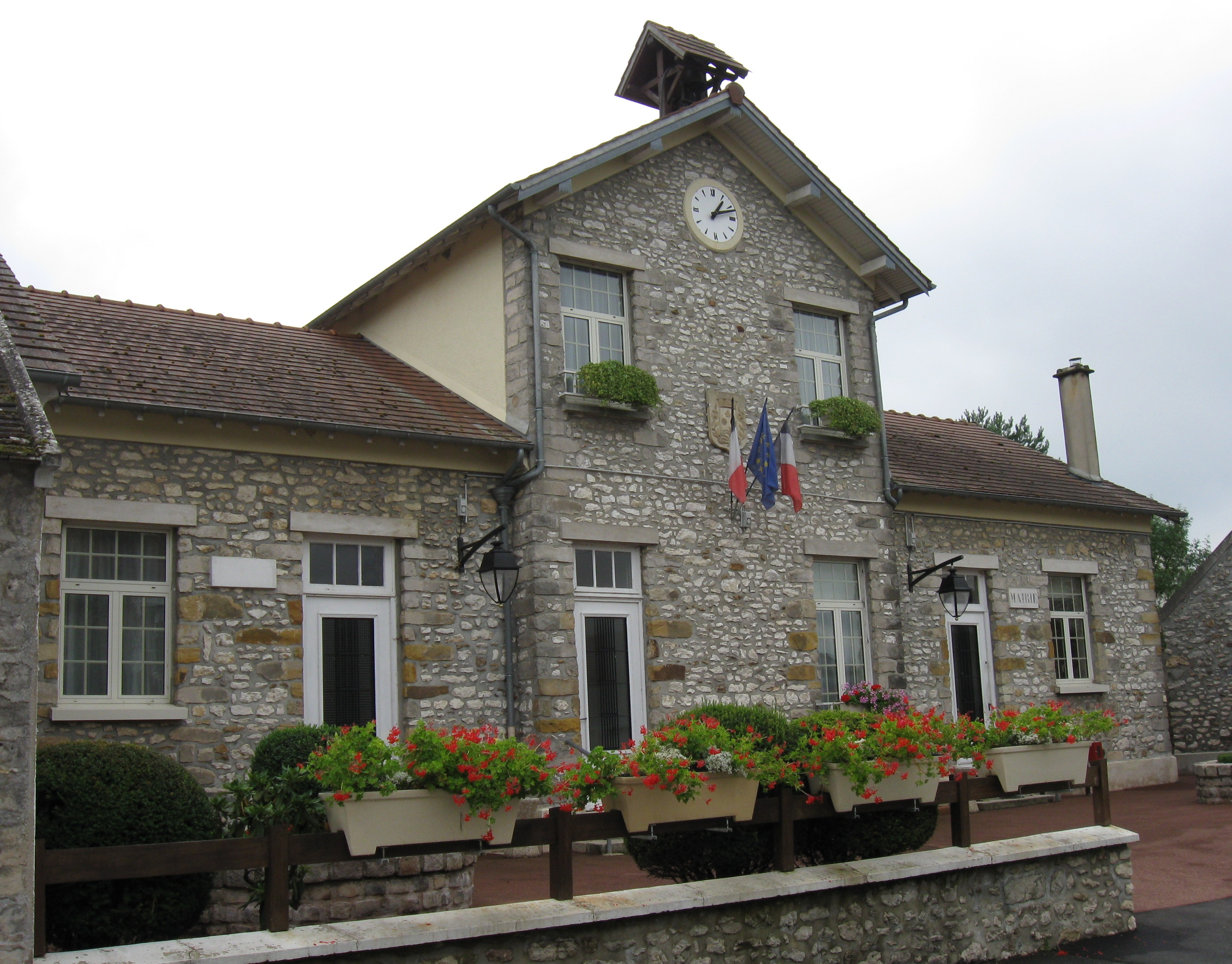
- The town hall in Pamfou

- Coat of arms
- Location of Pamfou
- Location within France Location within Île-de-France (region)
- Coordinates: 48°27′44″N 2°52′19″E
- Country: France
- Region: Île-de-France
- Department: Seine-et-Marne
- Arrondissement: Melun
- Canton: Nangis
- Intercommunality: CC Brie des Rivières et Châteaux

Government
  - Mayor (2020–2026): Pierre-François Prioux
- Area^{1}: 10.41 km^{2} (4.02 sq mi)
- Highest elevation: 128 m (420 ft)
- Lowest elevation: 82 m (269 ft)
- Population (2023): 983
  - Density: 94.4/km^{2} (245/sq mi)
- Time zone: UTC+01:00 (CET)
  - Summer (DST): UTC+02:00 (CEST)
- INSEE/Postal code: 77354 /77830
- ^{1} French Land Register data, which excludes lakes, ponds, glaciers > 1 km^{2} (0.386 sq mi or 247 acres) and river estuaries.

Pamfou (French pronunciation: [pɑ̃fu]) is a commune in the Seine-et-Marne department in the Île-de-France region in north-central France.

== Demographics ==
Inhabitants are called Pamfoliens.

== See also ==
- Communes of the Seine-et-Marne department
