= Féricy =

- Commune
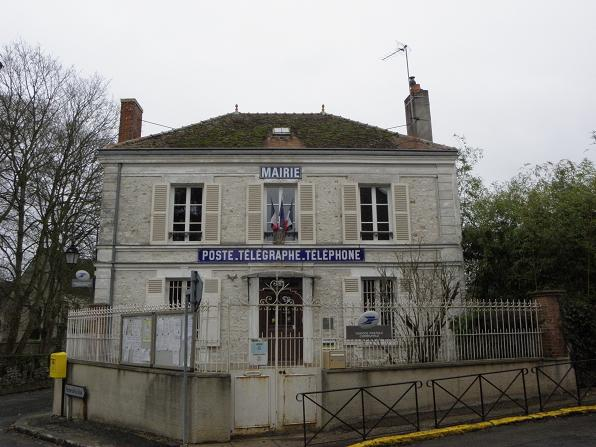
- The town hall in Féricy

- Coat of arms
- Location of Féricy
- Location within France Location within Île-de-France (region)
- Coordinates: 48°27′34″N 2°48′05″E
- Country: France
- Region: Île-de-France
- Department: Seine-et-Marne
- Arrondissement: Melun
- Canton: Nangis
- Intercommunality: CC Brie des Rivières et Châteaux

Government
  - Mayor (2020–2026): Jean-Luc Germain
- Area^{1}: 9.33 km^{2} (3.60 sq mi)
- Highest elevation: 109 m (358 ft)
- Lowest elevation: 52 m (171 ft)
- Population (2023): 625
  - Density: 67.0/km^{2} (173/sq mi)
- Time zone: UTC+01:00 (CET)
  - Summer (DST): UTC+02:00 (CEST)
- INSEE/Postal code: 77179 /77133
- ^{1} French Land Register data, which excludes lakes, ponds, glaciers > 1 km^{2} (0.386 sq mi or 247 acres) and river estuaries.

Féricy (French pronunciation: [feʁisi]) is a commune in the Seine-et-Marne department in the Île-de-France region in north-central France.

== Demographics ==
Inhabitants of Féricy are called Fériciens.

== See also ==
- Communes of the Seine-et-Marne department
