= Échouboulains =

- Commune
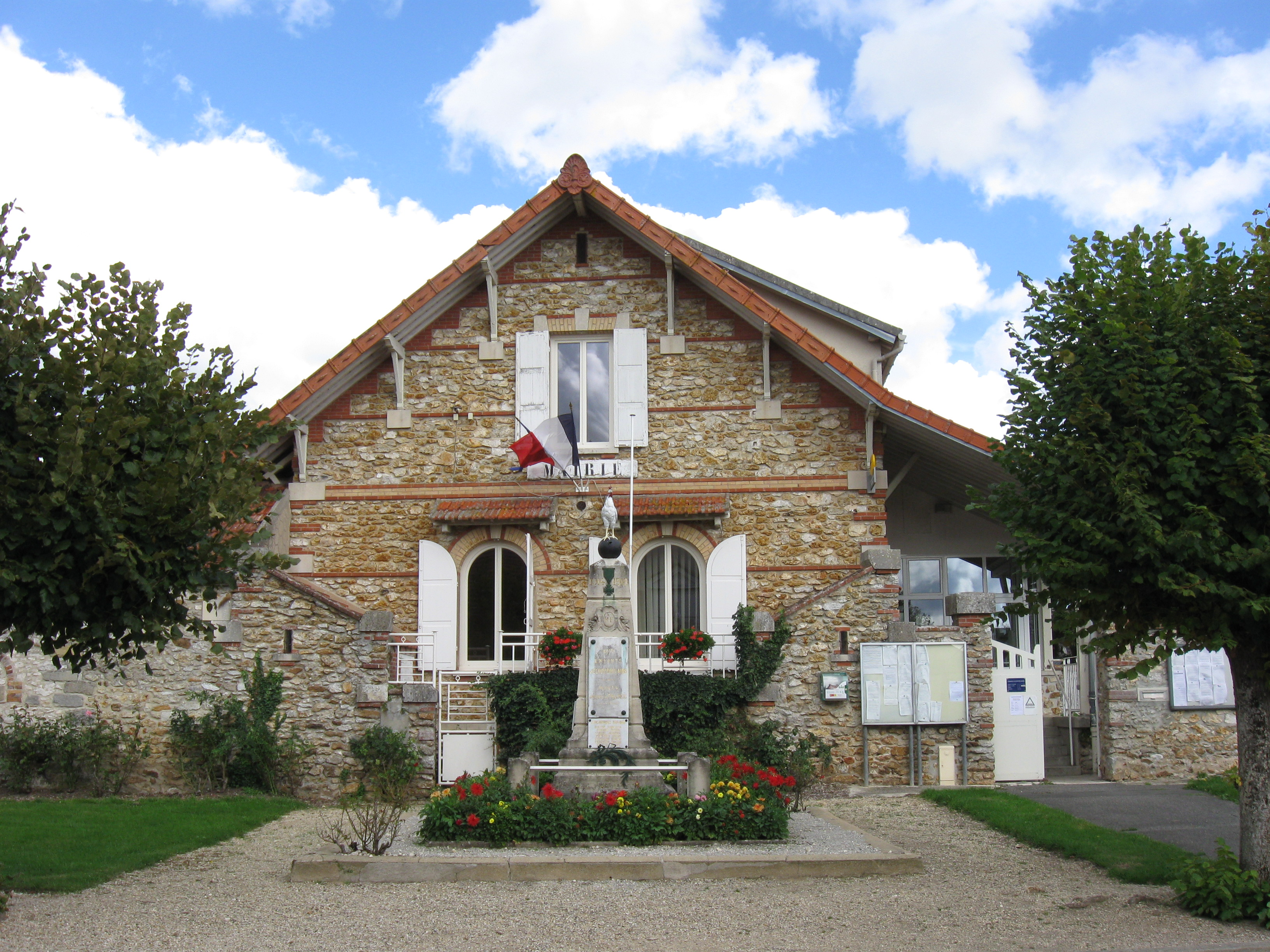
- The town hall in Échouboulains

- Coat of arms
- Location of Échouboulains
- Location within France Location within Île-de-France (region)
- Coordinates: 48°27′48″N 2°53′55″E
- Country: France
- Region: Île-de-France
- Department: Seine-et-Marne
- Arrondissement: Melun
- Canton: Nangis
- Intercommunality: CC Brie des Rivières et Châteaux

Government
  - Mayor (2020–2026): Mathias Vigier
- Area^{1}: 20.91 km^{2} (8.07 sq mi)
- Highest elevation: 131 m (430 ft)
- Lowest elevation: 94 m (308 ft)
- Population (2023): 555
  - Density: 26.5/km^{2} (68.7/sq mi)
- Time zone: UTC+01:00 (CET)
  - Summer (DST): UTC+02:00 (CEST)
- INSEE/Postal code: 77164 /77830
- ^{1} French Land Register data, which excludes lakes, ponds, glaciers > 1 km^{2} (0.386 sq mi or 247 acres) and river estuaries.

Échouboulains (French pronunciation: [eʃubulɛ̃]) is a commune in the Seine-et-Marne department in the Île-de-France region in north-central France.

== Demographics ==
Inhabitants of Échouboulains are called Échouboulinois.

== See also ==
- Communes of the Seine-et-Marne department
- Hole in the Wall Gang Camp
