= Fouju =

- Commune
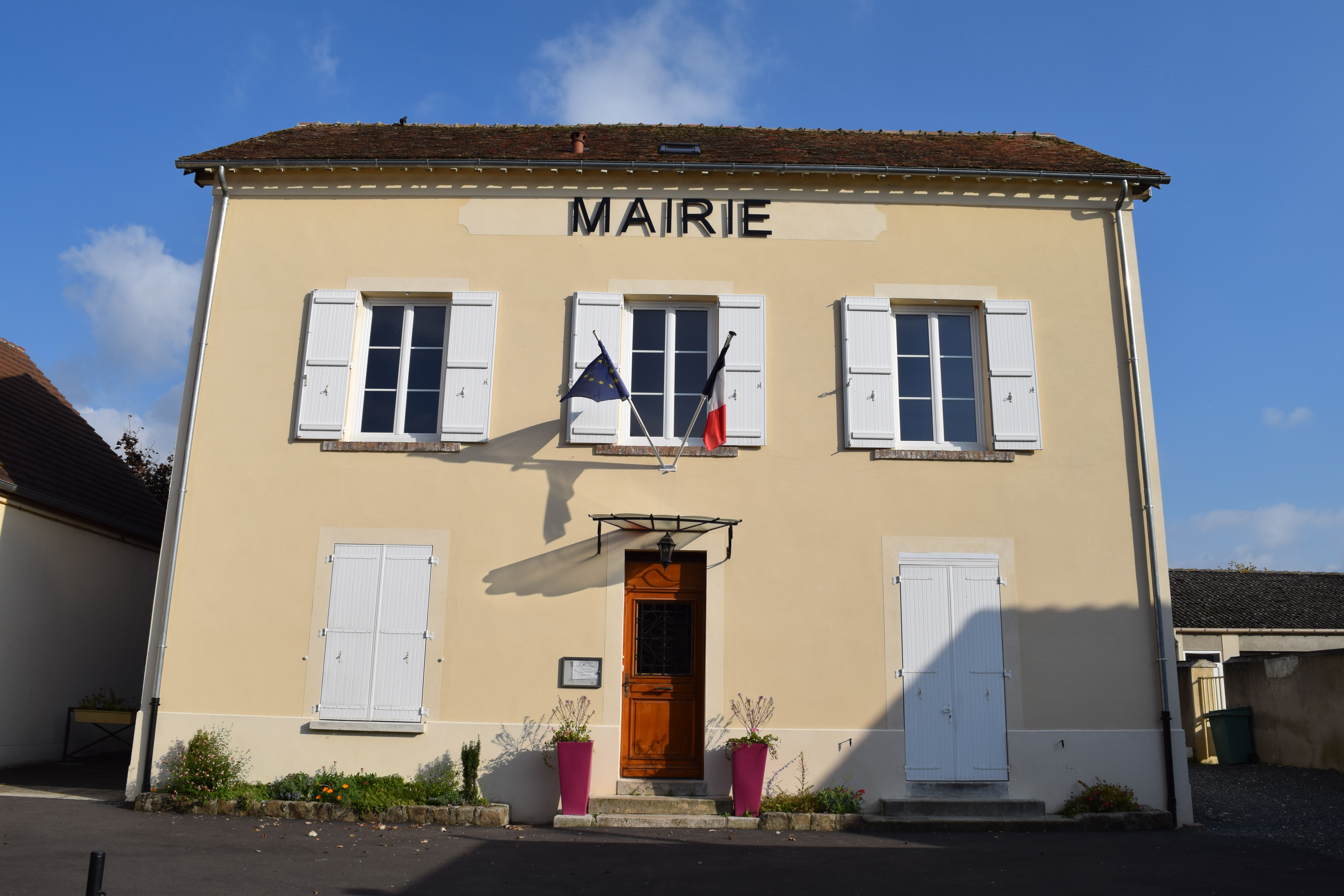
- The town hall in Fouju

- Coat of arms
- Location of Fouju
- Location within France Location within Île-de-France (region)
- Coordinates: 48°35′05″N 2°46′36″E
- Country: France
- Region: Île-de-France
- Department: Seine-et-Marne
- Arrondissement: Melun
- Canton: Nangis
- Intercommunality: CC Brie des Rivières et Châteaux

Government
  - Mayor (2020–2026): Jonathan Wochenmayer
- Area^{1}: 7.81 km^{2} (3.02 sq mi)
- Highest elevation: 99 m (325 ft)
- Lowest elevation: 84 m (276 ft)
- Population (2023): 655
  - Density: 83.9/km^{2} (217/sq mi)
- Time zone: UTC+01:00 (CET)
  - Summer (DST): UTC+02:00 (CEST)
- INSEE/Postal code: 77195 /77390
- ^{1} French Land Register data, which excludes lakes, ponds, glaciers > 1 km^{2} (0.386 sq mi or 247 acres) and river estuaries.

Fouju (French pronunciation: [fuʒy]) is a commune in the Seine-et-Marne department in the Île-de-France region in north-central France.

== Demographics ==
Inhabitants of Fouju are called Forjaviens.

== See also ==
- Communes of the Seine-et-Marne department
