= SAVIEM SC 10 =

French standard urban bus model produced 1965–1989

Saviem SC10
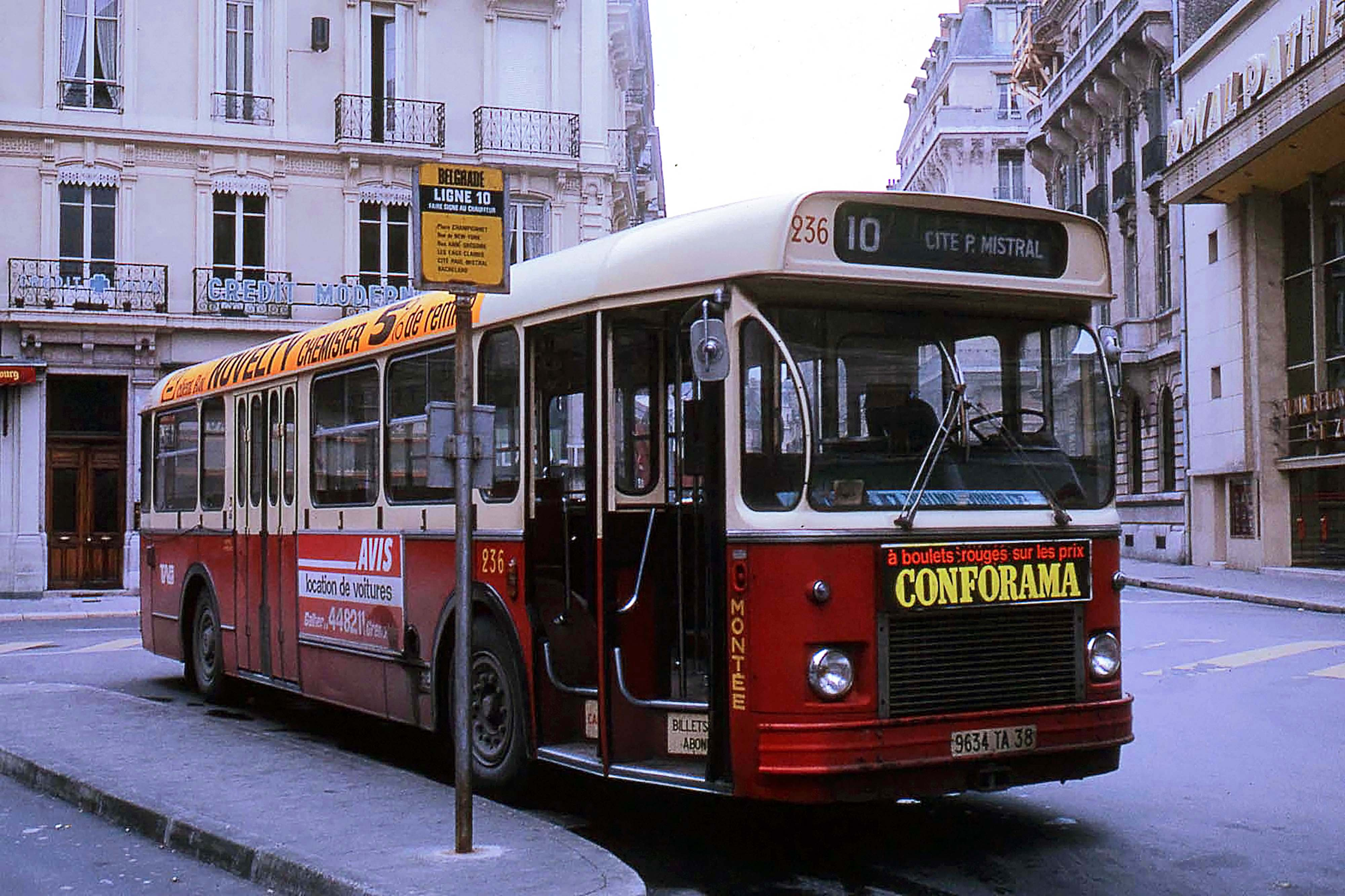
- Saviem SC 10 U (TAG, Grenoble, 1975)

Overview
- Manufacturer: Saviem
- Production: 1965–1989
- Assembly: Annonay, France

Body and chassis
- Class: Urban bus
- Body style: 2 or 3 doors (pneumatic operation)
- Layout: Rear-engine, rear-wheel-drive

Powertrain
- Engine: MAN diesel six-cylinder horizontal inline type D 0836 HM 8V, 7,034 cm³, 150 hp at 2,500 rpm MAN D 0846 HM 82 U, 7,258 cm³, 160 hp SAE (144 hp DIN) at 2,500 rpm 165 hp 170 hp Derated in some cities to 135 hp
- Capacity: 31 seated / 47 standing
- Transmission: Manual Automatic

Dimensions
- Length: 11,000 mm
- Width: 2,500 mm
- Height: 2,940 mm
- Curb weight: 8,150 kg / 8,665 kg

Chronology
- Predecessor: Saviem SC3 and SC4 (Chausson AP)
- Successor: Renault PR100 Renault R312

The SAVIEM SC 10 is a city bus model built by Société anonyme de véhicules industriels et d'équipements mécaniques (SAVIEM), the standard French bus model. The letters SC stand for SAVIEM-Chausson.

The result of a joint study by RATP and the Union des transports publics urbains et régionaux (UPTUR), the first commercial version of the SC 10 was unveiled in September 1965.. Several modifications were made over the years, culminating in the final version, the SC 10 R, which was produced between 1982 and 1989. Of the 11,004 units built, only fifteen were sold abroad, in Brescia, Italy; all the others were destined for French networks. However, many buses were bought second-hand in third world countries, where they continued to operate for several years after being taken out of service in France.

== History ==
=== Origins ===
At the end of the 1950s, urban public transport in France was almost exclusively provided by buses, with the exception of the Paris metro, a few trolleybuses, and a handful of tram networks. Buses were generally produced in small series by various manufacturers; they were expensive to purchase and maintain and difficult to amortize; their characteristics varied, but they all shared a glaring lack of comfort: floors that were too high, ceilings that were too low, and cramped access.

In 1958, the RATP and the UPTUR joined forces to develop specifications for a new standardized city bus, better known as the "standard bus" .The specifications included a length of 11 m, a flat floor no more than 63.5 cm above the ground, a minimum interior height of 2.20 m with windows 1.78 m above the floor, an anti-glare cylindrical windshield, and a 150 hp engine located under the driver's seat. SAVIEM, Berliet, and Verney responded favorably to the call for tenders, but the latter manufacturer quickly withdrew due to insufficient production capacity.

In 1961, after extensive research, SAVIEM delivered its first SC 10 prototype to the RATP.It differed visually from the production models in that the front end, with its “cap” supporting the wind vane, did not extend the full width of the roof, and the windshield had a central pillar. In June 1963, it was presented internationally for the first time in Vienna, Austria.

On May 19, 1965, the first vehicle in the series to roll off the production line in Annonay was approved by the French Ministry of Mines. Nancy was the first provincial network to receive SC 10 buses in 1965. The French Fulgur engine installed on the prototypes, deemed too underpowered, was replaced on the production buses by a German MAN engine, a 150 hp horizontal 6-cylinder in-line diesel engine limited to 135 hp, with M3 combustion technology. MAN engines were used in all SC 10s until the end of production of the series.

=== Production ===
The SC 10 was a huge commercial success in France. By November 1969, there were already 1,440 of them in service on French rail networks.

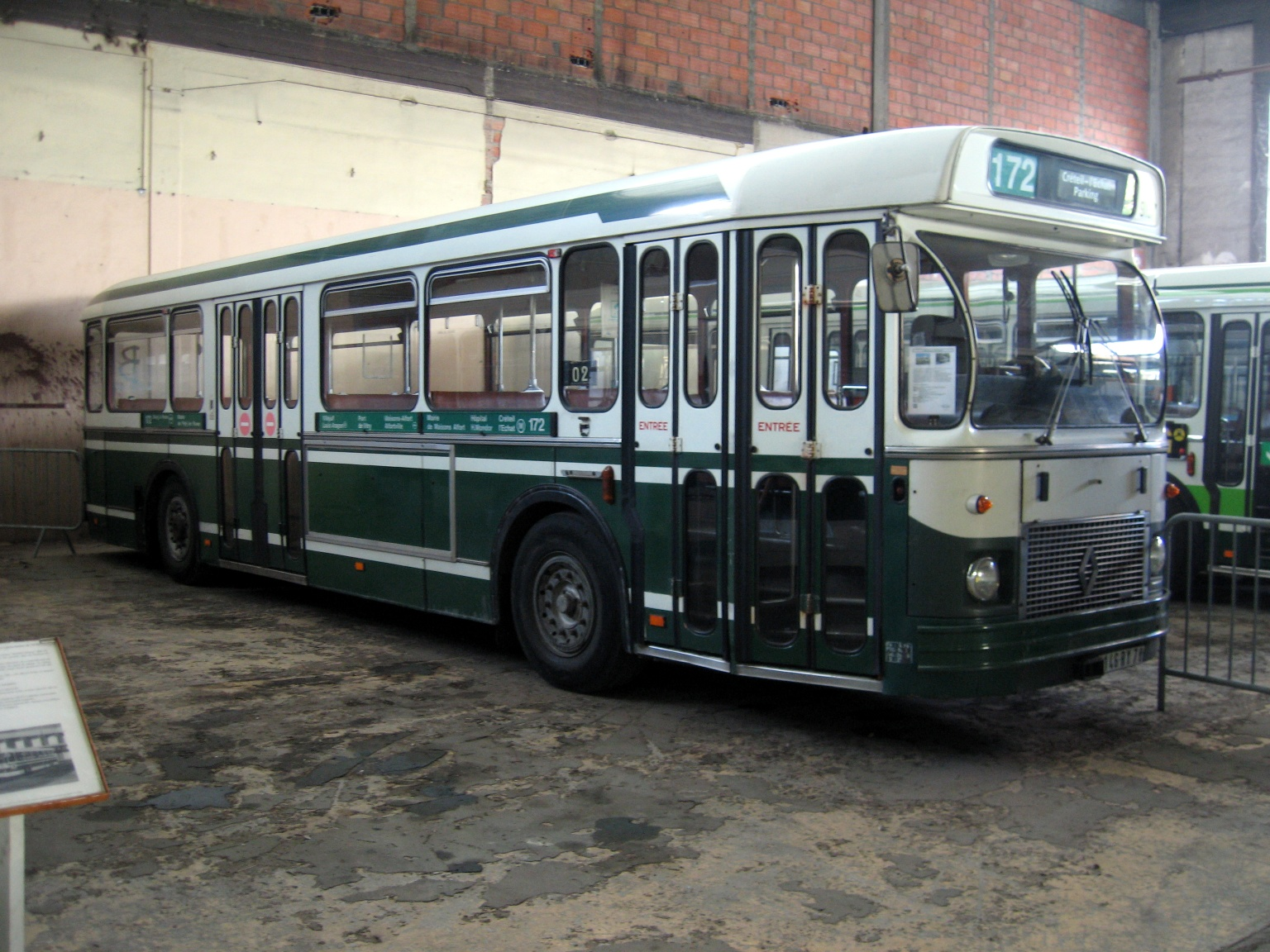
Renault SC 10 UO (RATP, 1981)

From the start of production, several different door configurations were offered, including the SC 10 244 DPA (“D” for offset door) and the SC 10 U 044 PA, for single-operator service. A version without rear corner windows and equipped with small round taillights was marketed under the name SC 10 L. In 1970, the front turn signals were moved from their original position next to the headlights to above them. In October 1974, SAVIEM introduced the SC 10 UM (M for modernized) with improved soundproofing thanks to engine encapsulation, a dual-flow exhaust, and intake silencers. The braking system was improved to comply with EEC standards. In September 1975, a working group was set up to modernize the SC 10, resulting in a second generation; that same year, a large rear window replaced the two windows on the rear.

In 1977, Saviem and Berliet merged to become Renault Véhicules Industriels (RVI), leading to the definitive discontinuation of the SAVIEM brand in 1980. The Saviem SC10 became the Renault SC10. Shortly thereafter, it underwent a number of improvements and was renamed SC10 UO.

In the fall of 1981, the Renault SC 10 R (“R” for restyled) was unveiled. There were no major changes except for a new, sleeker, more modern look that did away with the rounded front end. The windshield was no longer cylindrical but retained a curved shape at the top. The side doors were now fully glazed; there were two steps instead of one, even though the floor height remained unchanged, and thermal comfort was improved (ventilation, heating, defrosting). At the rear, only the lights were restyled. The engine remains unchanged. The new version is produced for seven and a half years, during which time 1,630 units are manufactured. On March 4, 1986, the Annonay factory celebrates the production of its 10,000th SC 10. In 1987, this bus accounts for 91% of the RATP fleet.

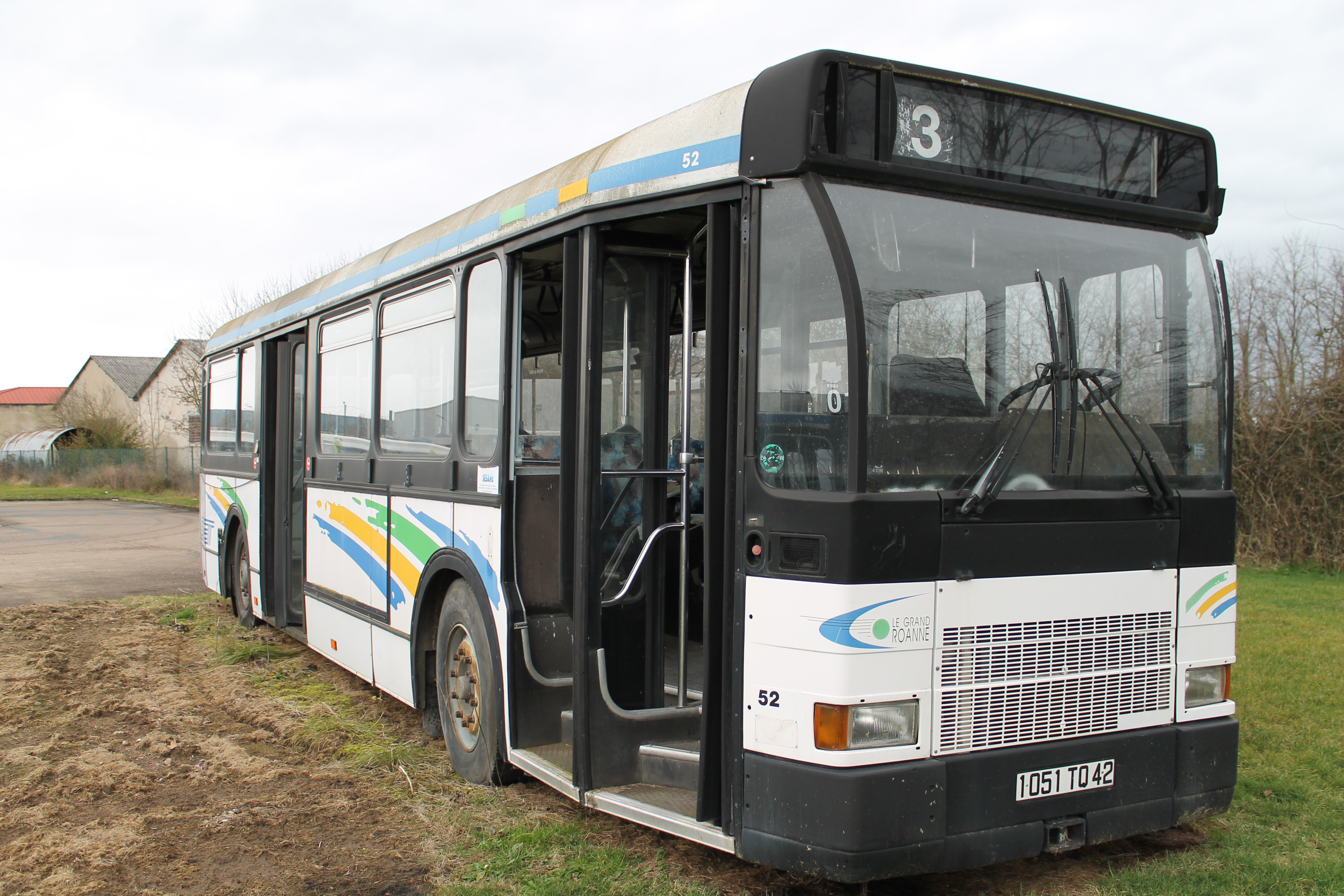
Renault SC 10 R (No. 52, STAR, Roanne)

March 1989 marked the end of production of the SC 10, after 11,004 units had been manufactured over a period of 24 years, including more than 3,000 “restyled” models. However, this great success was limited to France; the bus was not sold abroad except in Brescia, Italy, which purchased 15 units.

(Note: This acquisition sparked controversy in Brescia, where the contract amount was never disclosed, even though city buses were, at the time, purchased through national tenders and supplied to municipalities by the Italian Ministry of Transport).

=== Open rear platform ===
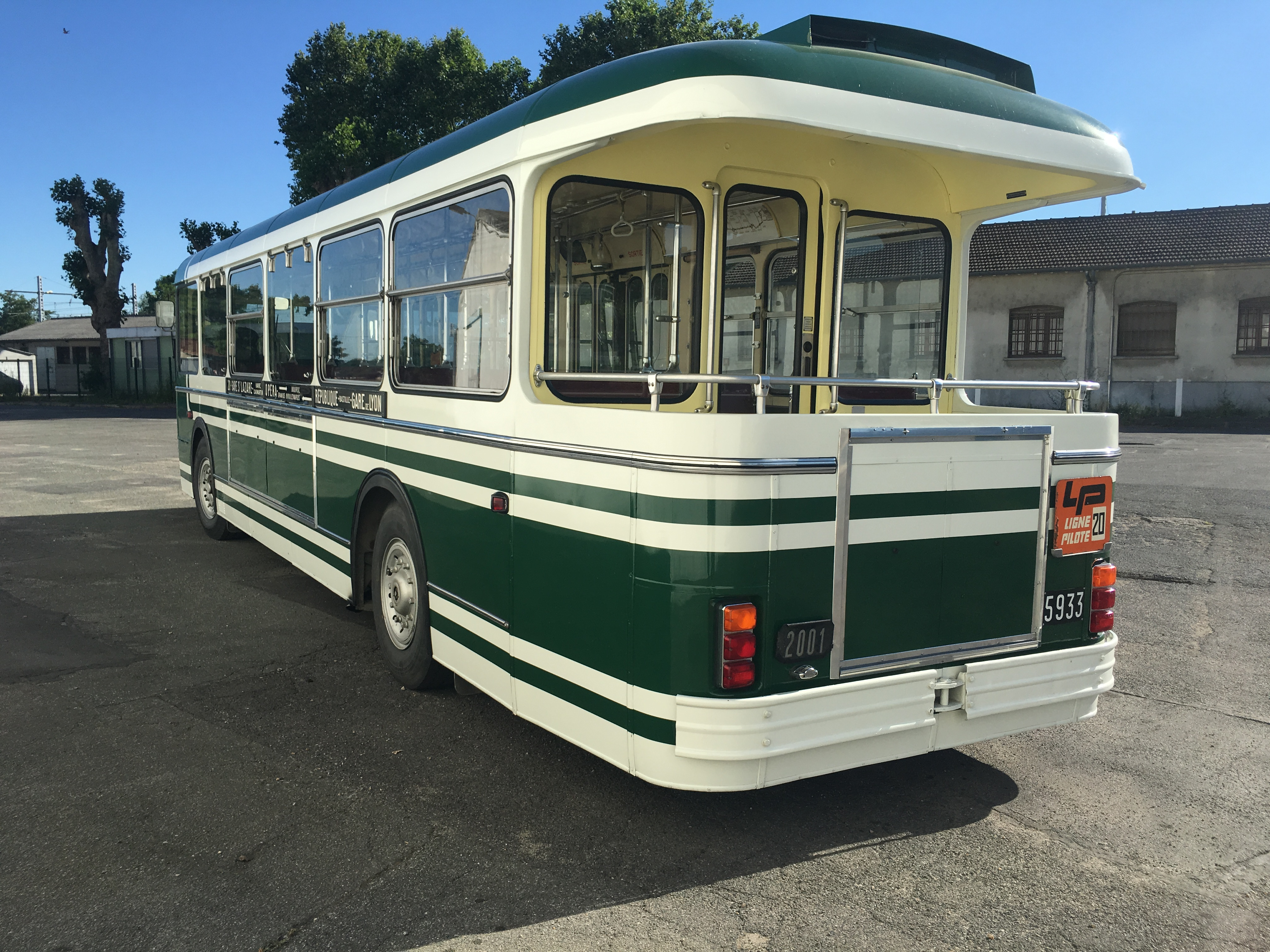
SC 10 U No. 5933 with platform (ex-RATP) – SAUVABUS

Following a 1976 accident that severely damaged the rear of SC10 U No. 5933, the RATP decided during repairs to create an open rear platform, similar to pre-war Renault TN buses and earlier Brillié-Schneider PB2 from 1911. This created the SC10 UPF.

This SC10 (No. 5933) has been preserved by the SAUVABUS association since 1983, when it was retired.

This design was very well received by users, so SAVIEM took up the idea and offered a version of the SC 10 with an open rear platform that could be accessed from inside the vehicle via a sliding door. This model evolved along with the rest of the range, and the last to be marketed was the SC 10 RA (RA meaning restyled with rear platform), of which 34 were produced. The SC 10 with rear platform was used in Paris (89 units) but also in seventeen other cities, plus thirteen networks that purchased them second-hand. RATP line 29 was the last to operate buses with open rear platforms until February 2002.

=== Experiments and modifications ===
The SC10 received numerous modifications during its career, usually in small numbers, mostly for the RATP, its largest customer with half of all orders.

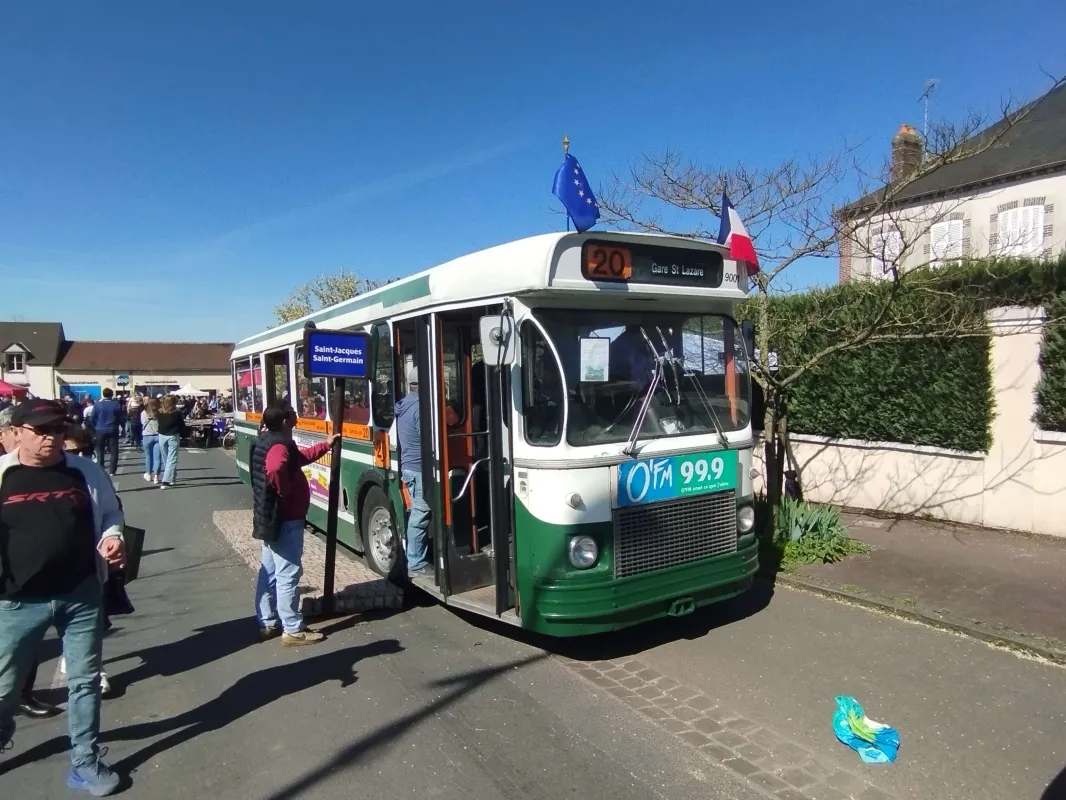
Front of a Saviem SC10, Courtenay (Loiret)

This led to the creation of a prototype bus equipped with disc brakes—an SC 10 equipped with drum brakes—a feature that was not adopted in series production for technical reasons. Around fifty vehicles (SC 10 UX) had their engine power increased to 170 hp and their maximum speed to 72 km/h for service to Orly and Roissy-Charles-de-Gaulle airports, with the seats rearranged to face the direction of travel. As this type of bus also provided excursion services, it had to be equipped with a spare wheel, which was attached to the outside of the rear.

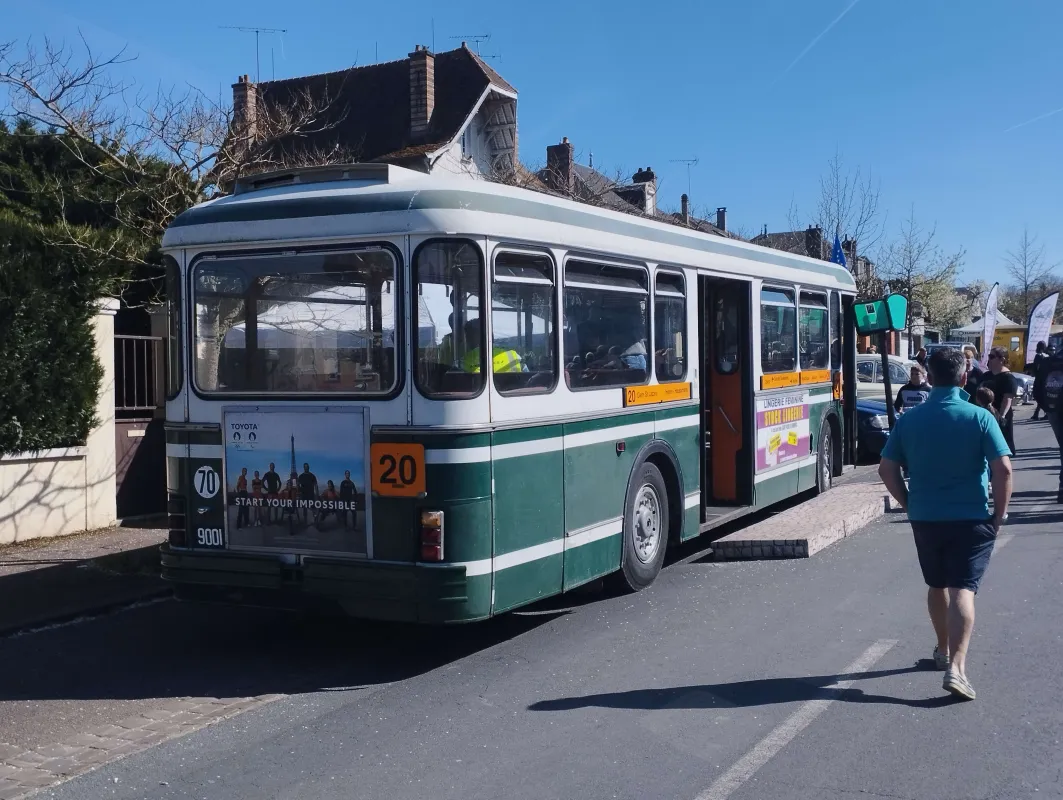
Rear view of a Saviem SC10, Courtenay (Loiret)

Four SC 10s are equipped with hydrostatic transmission. Another model is converted into a diesel-electric bus, whose engine drives an alternator that powers electric motors connected to the drive wheels. A bus running on LPG is tested. These three attempts to diversify the powertrain are unsuccessful.

=== End of the Renault SC10 ===
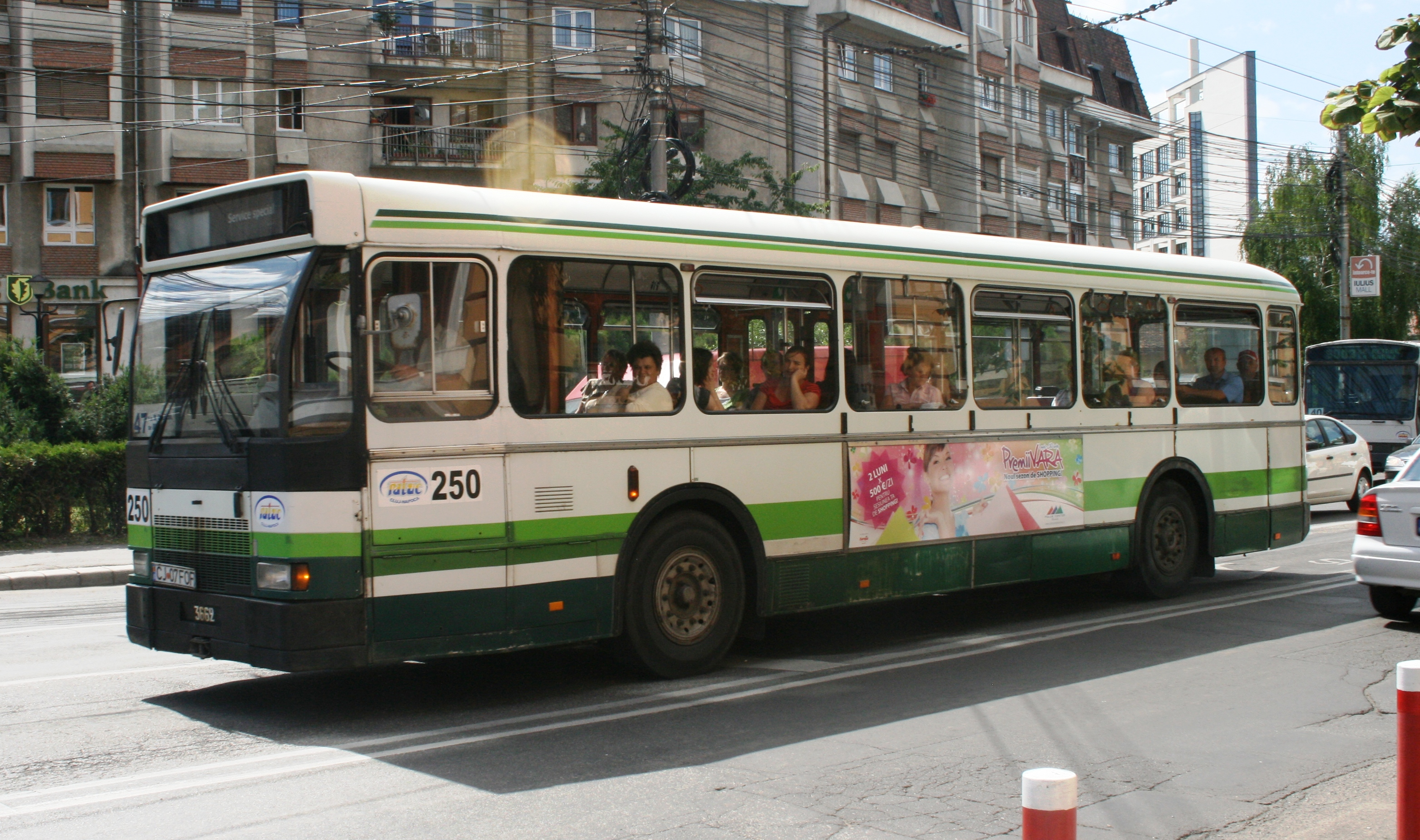
Renault SC 10 R (RATUC, Cluj-Napoca, Romania, 2011)

Starting in 2000, stricter European anti-pollution standards accelerated the already well-advanced reform of the SC 10: buses equipped with more powerful, more efficient, and less polluting engines were introduced, and the R.312 and then Irisbus Agora from the same manufacturer took over; the comfort and accessibility of these new models were also improved thanks to a low floor throughout. The last Parisian SC 10 buses remained in service until March 12, 2002 , but some provincial cities continued to use them for longer. The last ones in commercial service continued to run on the two lines of the Bastia network until 2013.

However, since being replaced on French public transport networks, many SC 10s have been given a new lease of life by being reconditioned and purchased by individuals or local authorities for school transport. They can also be found on foreign networks thanks to the second-hand market: SC 10s are in use in Cambodia, Myanmar, Albania, Armenia, Romania, Russia, and many African countries.

== Specifications ==
=== General characteristics ===
- Manufacturer: Saviem, later RVI
- Chassis: Tubular beam frame
- Body: Removable screwed side panels, Duralinox aluminum roof
- Passenger capacity: 93 (27 seated, 66 standing)
- Length: 11.045 m
- Width: 2.50 m
- Height: 2.96 m
- Interior height: 2.20 m
- Wheelbase: 5.58 m
- Turning circle: 22 m
- Unladen weight: 8.1 t
- Gross vehicle weight: 15 t
- Power: 19 fiscal hp - 165 hp actual (up to 170 hp)
- Top speed: 50 to 85 km/h depending on version
- Fuel tank: 228 litres
- Window height: 80 cm
- Doors: 2 or 3 doors, 2 or 4 leaves. Accessibility indicated by model code numbers, e.g., SC10.U.044 has 0 rear doors, middle door with 4 leaves, front with 4 leaves.

=== Engine specifications ===
Vehicles	Numbers 1 to 1300	No. 1300 to end of production
Fuel	Diesel	
Engine	MAN D0836 HM 8V	MAN D0846 HM 82 U
Construction		
Type	horizontal 6-cylinder	horizontal 6-cylinder
Emission standard		
Displacement	7 043 cm^{3}	7 258 cm^{3}
Power	110 kW (150 hp) at 2,500 rpm	118 kW (160 hp SAE) at 2,500 rpm
Torque		
Fuel consumption + CO_{2}		
Gearboxes	automatic SAVIEM R.107 3-speed + overdrive + 1 reverse; manual SAVIEM 332 5- or 6-speed + 1 reverse; Wilson Pont-à-Mousson HVD gearbox 4 forward speeds + 1 reverse with manual, mechanical, electrical or automatic control	

== Production ==
List
Network	Model	Number	Numbers	Delivery	Remarks
Albi					Buses with 2 main doors, and a 3rd, at the rear of the bus, slightly smaller.
Amiens					
Dunkerque		37	110 to 146	1969 to 1992	The last two delivered are ex-RATP from 1977
Bordeaux					
Brest					
Calais					
Châtellerault					
Colmar		10			
Grenoble - SEMITAG	SC 10 U 044	22	214-235 (Note: The series also includes two second-hand buses No. 284 and 285, which are ex-VFD 248 and 250.)	1966-1977	No. 272 is preserved by the Standard 216 association.
Grenoble - SEMITAG	SC 10 U 444D	42	239-280 (Note: The series also includes three second-hand buses, Nos. 281 to 283, which are ex-VFD 265, 266 and 263.)	1974-1979	
Grenoble - SEMITAG	SC 10 PF 244D	1	286	1978	No. 286 is the ex-VFD 264, preserved by the Standard 216 association.
Grenoble - VFD	SC 10 U 044	14	231-234, 244-251, 261-262	1975-1977	
Grenoble - VFD	SC 10 U 444D	3	263, 265-266	1978-1979	
Grenoble - VFD	SC 10 PF 244D	1	264	1978	Former 1976 demonstration bus.
Le Havre					
Le Mans					
Limoges					
Lyon		866			
Metz		18			
Montluçon	SC 10 R 044	14	15-28	1982-1987	
Mulhouse	SC 10 R 044	1	375	1983	
Nancy					
Nantes	SC 10 U 044	86			
Nice	SC 10 442D	184	101 to 105	1966 to 1983	Preserved museum buses: SC10.U.PF.244 No. 203 to 205, SC10.R.444.D No. 249, SC10.L.044 No. 74, SC10.U.044 No. 113
Nice	SC 10 U 444D	184	111 to 120, 186 to 200, 206 to 219, 220 to 219	1966 to 1983	Preserved museum buses: SC10.U.PF.244 No. 203 to 205, SC10.R.444.D No. 249, SC10.L.044 No. 74, SC10.U.044 No. 113
Nice	SC 10 U 444	184	171 to 180	1966 to 1983	Preserved museum buses: SC10.U.PF.244 No. 203 to 205, SC10.R.444.D No. 249, SC10.L.044 No. 74, SC10.U.044 No. 113
Nice	SC 10 L 044	184	150 to 153, 01 to 14, 60 to 88	1966 to 1983	Preserved museum buses: SC10.U.PF.244 No. 203 to 205, SC10.R.444.D No. 249, SC10.L.044 No. 74, SC10.U.044 No. 113
Nice	SC 10 U 044	184	103 to 127	1966 to 1983	Preserved museum buses: SC10.U.PF.244 No. 203 to 205, SC10.R.444.D No. 249, SC10.L.044 No. 74, SC10.U.044 No. 113
Nice	SC 10 U PF244	184	184, 185, 203 to 205	1966 to 1983	Preserved museum buses: SC10.U.PF.244 No. 203 to 205, SC10.R.444.D No. 249, SC10.L.044 No. 74, SC10.U.044 No. 113
Nice	SC 10 UO 444D	184	230 to 235	1966 to 1983	Preserved museum buses: SC10.U.PF.244 No. 203 to 205, SC10.R.444.D No. 249, SC10.L.044 No. 74, SC10.U.044 No. 113
Nice	SC 10 R 444D	184	246 to 272, 283 to 292	1966 to 1983	Preserved museum buses: SC10.U.PF.244 No. 203 to 205, SC10.R.444.D No. 249, SC10.L.044 No. 74, SC10.U.044 No. 113
Orléans	SC 10 U				SC 10 UPF No. 010 preserved and SC 10 U No. 29 under reconstruction
Poitiers					
Paris		5580			There are rear-platform versions from 1976 to 2002
Reims	SC 10 U	85	C112 to C114, C117 to C123, C128 to C131 (Note: Later renumbered: 43 to 45, 48 to 54, 59 to 116, 125 to 141 then again 201 to 273, 298, 299.)	1972-1980	In the 3rd, 2xx series with two doors and 3xx series with three doors.
Reims	SC 10 R	51	Unknown (Note: Later renumbered: 149 to 161, 173 to 179 then again 274, 275 and 301 to 349.)	1981-1988	
Rennes	SC 10 U	108	6..120 (Note: Discontinuous numbering.)	1970-1980	
Rennes	SC 10 R	28	121-148	1981-1986	Bus 148 preserved.
Roanne		19			
Rouen		40			
Saint-Lô		2			One with 2 doors, and one with 3 doors
Saint-Nazaire	SC 10 UO				
Saint-Nazaire	SC 10 R	11	300-310		One example, the SC10 R #304, in service from 1986 to 2001, is preserved by « Rétro Bus Nazairiens » (preservation and restoration association).
Strasbourg		234	750 to 984		
Toulon					
Toulouse		135			48 SC 10 R during the explosion at the AZF factory in Toulouse
Tours	SC 10 U 044	22	21-25 (1968), 31-37 (1969) and 41-50 (1970)	1968-1970	
Versailles	SC 10 L	at least 1	including 25	1968	The SC 10 UPF No. 77 is preserved. Nos. 121-122 are second-hand buses from 1983 Nos. 123-124 are second-hand buses from 1984 The SC 10 R #145 is preserved by APTRP
Versailles	SC 10 U 044	22	54-65, 67-73, 78, 90, 95	1973-1980	The SC 10 UPF No. 77 is preserved. Nos. 121-122 are second-hand buses from 1983 Nos. 123-124 are second-hand buses from 1984 The SC 10 R #145 is preserved by APTRP
Versailles	SC 10 UPF 044	1	77	1977	The SC 10 UPF No. 77 is preserved. Nos. 121-122 are second-hand buses from 1983 Nos. 123-124 are second-hand buses from 1984 The SC 10 R #145 is preserved by APTRP
Versailles	SC 10 R 044D	16	98-101, 103-108, 112-115, 121-122	1984-1994	The SC 10 UPF No. 77 is preserved. Nos. 121-122 are second-hand buses from 1983 Nos. 123-124 are second-hand buses from 1984 The SC 10 R #145 is preserved by APTRP
Versailles	SC 10 R 444D	16	119-120, 123-124, 131-132, 134-139, 142-145	1988-1995	The SC 10 UPF No. 77 is preserved. Nos. 121-122 are second-hand buses from 1983 Nos. 123-124 are second-hand buses from 1984 The SC 10 R #145 is preserved by APTRP
Vichy		6			
Iskitim		8		2004-?	
Novy Urengoy		2		1999/2000-?	
Orenburg		1	0488		
Saint Petersburg		7	5280, 5282, 5374, 5564, 5672, 5876, 5878	1992-1997	

== Preserved vehicles ==
Location	Entity	Former network	Model	Number	Fleet numbers	Observations - Particularities
Lille	AMITRAM	ELRT	SC 10 U	2	175, 292	
Malakoff	AMTUIR	RATP	SC 10 UB	1	7269	sold to Calypso Train Tours Ltd. (Belize)
Malakoff	AMTUIR	RATP	SC 10 R	1	3644	
Nevers	ASTUNEB	STUNIV	SC 10 R	2	None	
Orléans	Association « Arrêt Demandé »	SEMTAO	SC 10 UPF	1	10	Former SC 10 UPF No. 7866 from RATP, purchased by SEMTAO
Saint-Fargeau-Ponthierry	Association pour la sauvegarde du patrimoine roulant (ASPRO)	RATP	SC 10 R	1	9436	Former SC 10 R from RATP, purchased by the ASPRO association
Toulouse	ASPTUIT	SEMVAT	SC 10 U-PFA	1	7903	
Toulouse	ASPTUIT	SEMVAT	SC 10 R	1	8904	
Paris	SAUVABUS	RATP	SC 10 U	1	5933	Following a serious accident in 1976, the Championnet workshops built an open rear platform - Due to its success, several dozen buses were produced in this configuration.
Paris	SAUVABUS	RATP	SC10 UMCR	1	8826	Restored with the participation of the Championnet workshops RATP-CAP Ile-de-France, as part of the show "Vintage Mecanic".
Paris	SAUVABUS	RATP	SC 10 UMA	2	7862, 7894	
Paris	SAUVABUS	RATP	SC 10 R	1	9893	
Paris	SAUVABUS	RATP	SC 10 RA	3	3958, 3980, 3981	
