= Communauté de communes de Seine-École =

Seine-École
- Former communauté de communes
- Interactive map of Seine-École
- Coordinates: 48.5356°N 2.5241°E
- Country: France
- Region: Île-de-France
- Department: Seine-et-Marne
- No. of communes: {{{nbcomm}}}
- Established: 1974
- Disbanded: 2016
- Area: 21.02 km^{2} (8.12 sq mi)
- Population (1999): 13,719
  - Density: 652.7/km^{2} (1,690/sq mi)

The Communauté de communes de Seine-École is a former federation of municipalities (communauté de communes) in the Seine-et-Marne département and in the Île-de-France région of France. It was created in April 1974. It was merged into the Communauté d'agglomération Melun Val de Seine in January 2016.

== Composition ==
The Communauté de communes de Seine-École comprised 2 communes:

- Pringy
- Saint-Fargeau-Ponthierry

== See also ==
- Communes of the Seine-et-Marne department
