= Boissise =

Boissise may refer to several communes in France:

- Boissise-la-Bertrand, in the Seine-et-Marne department
- Boissise-le-Roi, in the Seine-et-Marne department
