= 1971 Cup of the Alps =

1971 Coppa delle Alpi
Alpencup, Coupe des Alpes
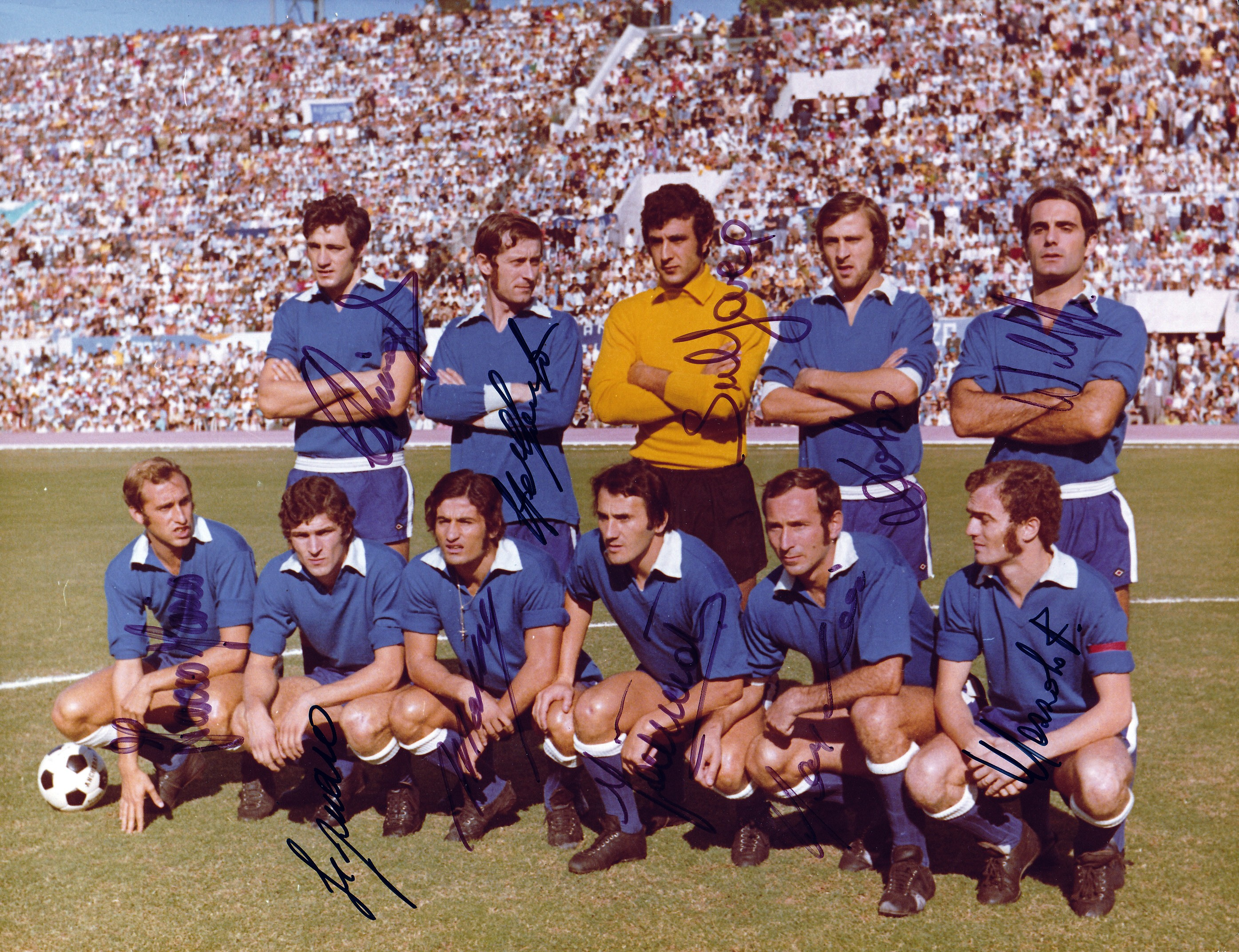
- 1970–71 Lazio

Tournament details
- Country: Switzerland
- Teams: 8

Final positions
- Champions: Lazio
- Runners-up: FC Basel

Tournament statistics
- Matches played: 16
- Goals scored: 51 (3.19 per match)
- Top goal scorer: Chinaglia (Lazio) (7)

1971 Coppa delle Alpi shows the results of the 1971 tournament that was held in Switzerland in the preseason 1971/72. The Coppa delle Alpi (translated as Cup of the Alps) was a football tournament, jointly organized by the Italian Football Federation and the Swiss Football Association as a pre-season event.

== Overview ==
There were four participants from Italy, these being Hellas Verona, Lazio, Sampdoria and Varese and there were four from Switzerland: Lugano, Lausanne Sports, Winterthur and FC Basel. Two teams from each country were drawn into each of the two groups. Within the group each team played the two clubs of the other country twice, but did not play compatriots. The Italians and the Swiss each formed their own league table and the winners from each country then matched themselves in the final.

== Matches ==
=== Group A ===
Round 1

12 June 1971

Sampdoria (Italy)	0 – 0	(Switzerland) Winterthur

12 June 1971

Lazio (Italy)	4 – 0	(Switzerland) Lugano
Manservisi 15'; Fortunato 47'; Berset 74' (o.g); Chinaglia 80'	Report Lazio

Stadio Olimpico, Rome
Attendance: 8,000
Referee: (Switzerland) Gattei

Round 2

15 June 1971

Sampdoria (Italy)	1 – 2	(Switzerland) Lugano
Spadetto 29'		25' Berset; 27' Arrigoni

16 June 1971

Lazio (Italy)	4 – 1	(Switzerland) Winterthur
Chinaglia 1', 17', 46'; Mazzola 70'	Report Lazio	Goal

Stadio Olimpico, Rome
Attendance: 9,000
Referee: (Switzerland) Keller

Round 3

19 June 1971

Winterthur (Switzerland)	1 – 3	(Italy) Sampdoria
Herbert Dimmeler 33'		14', 69' Francesconi; 84' Spadetto

Schützenwiese, Winterthur

19 June 1971

Lugano (Switzerland)	2 – 2	(Italy) Lazio
Hansen 15'; Luttrop 39'	Report Lazio	52' Fortunato; 57' Chinaglia

Cornaredo Stadium, Lugano
Attendance: 3,000
Referee: (Italy) Lorenzo Branzoni

Round 4

22 June 1971

Lugano (Switzerland)	1 – 2	(Italy) Sampdoria
Hansen 11'		25' Fotia; 50' Spadetto

Cornaredo Stadium, Lugano

22 June 1971

Winterthur (Switzerland)	2 – 5	(Italy) Lazio
Duvoisin 47'; Oettly 84'	Raport Lazio	10' Pierpaolo Manservisi; 16' Facco; 34' Costantino Fava; 66' Arrigo Dolso; 87' Morrone

Schützenwiese, Winterthur
Attendance: 5,000
Referee: (Italy) Gian Gaetano Vacchini

=== Group B ===
Round 1

12 June 1971

Varese (Italy)	1 – 0	(Switzerland) Lausanne Sports
Tamborini 42' (pen.)

12 June 1971

Hellas Verona (Italy)	3 – 2	(Switzerland) Basel
Orazi 7'; Clerici 40', 46' (pen.)		21' Mundschin; 30' Hauser

Round 2

15 June 1971

Varese (Italy)	0 – 1	(Switzerland) Basel
		75' Stohler

15 June 1971

Hellas Verona (Italy)	1 – 2	(Switzerland) Lausanne Sports
Clerici 11' (pen.)		47', 57' Franco Cucinotta

Round 3

19 June 1971

Basel (Switzerland)	4 – 1	(Italy) Hellas Verona
Balmer 17', 36', 69'; Demarmels 50'		19' Orazi

St. Jakob Stadium, Basel

19 June 1971

Lausanne Sports (Switzerland)	1 – 1	(Italy) Varese
Goal		Goal

Round 4

22 June 1971

Basel (Switzerland)	0 – 1	(Italy) Varese
		21' Morini

St. Jakob Stadium, Basel

22 June 1971

Lausanne Sports (Switzerland)	1 – 2	(Italy) Hellas Verona
Goal		Goal

== League Tables ==
=== Switzerland ===
Pos	Team	Pld	W	D	L	GF	GA	Pts	DPT
1	Basel	4	2	0	2	7	5	4	11
2	Lugano	4	1	1	2	5	9	3	8
3	Lausanne Sports	4	1	1	2	4	5	3	7
4	Winterthur	4	0	1	3	4	12	1	5

=== Italy ===
Pos	Team	Pld	W	D	L	GF	GA	Pts	DPT
1	Lazio	4	3	1	0	15	5	7	22
2	Sampdoria	4	2	1	1	6	4	5	11
3	Hellas Verona	4	2	0	2	7	9	4	11
4	Varese	4	2	1	1	3	2	5	8

NB: Decisive points total (DPT) computed as sum of points and goals scored

== Final ==
The Final was played in St. Jakob Stadium, Basel, between the winner of the Italien and the winner of the Swiss groups.

25 June 1971
Final

Basel (Switzerland)	1 – 3	(Italy) Lazio
Wenger 41'	Report Lazio	22'; 76', 86' (pen.) Chinaglia

St. Jakob Stadium, Basel
Referee: (Germany) Hans-Joachim Weyland

== Sources and References ==
- Cup of the Alps 1971 at RSSSF
