= Caerano di San Marco =

- Comune
- Comune di Caerano di San Marco
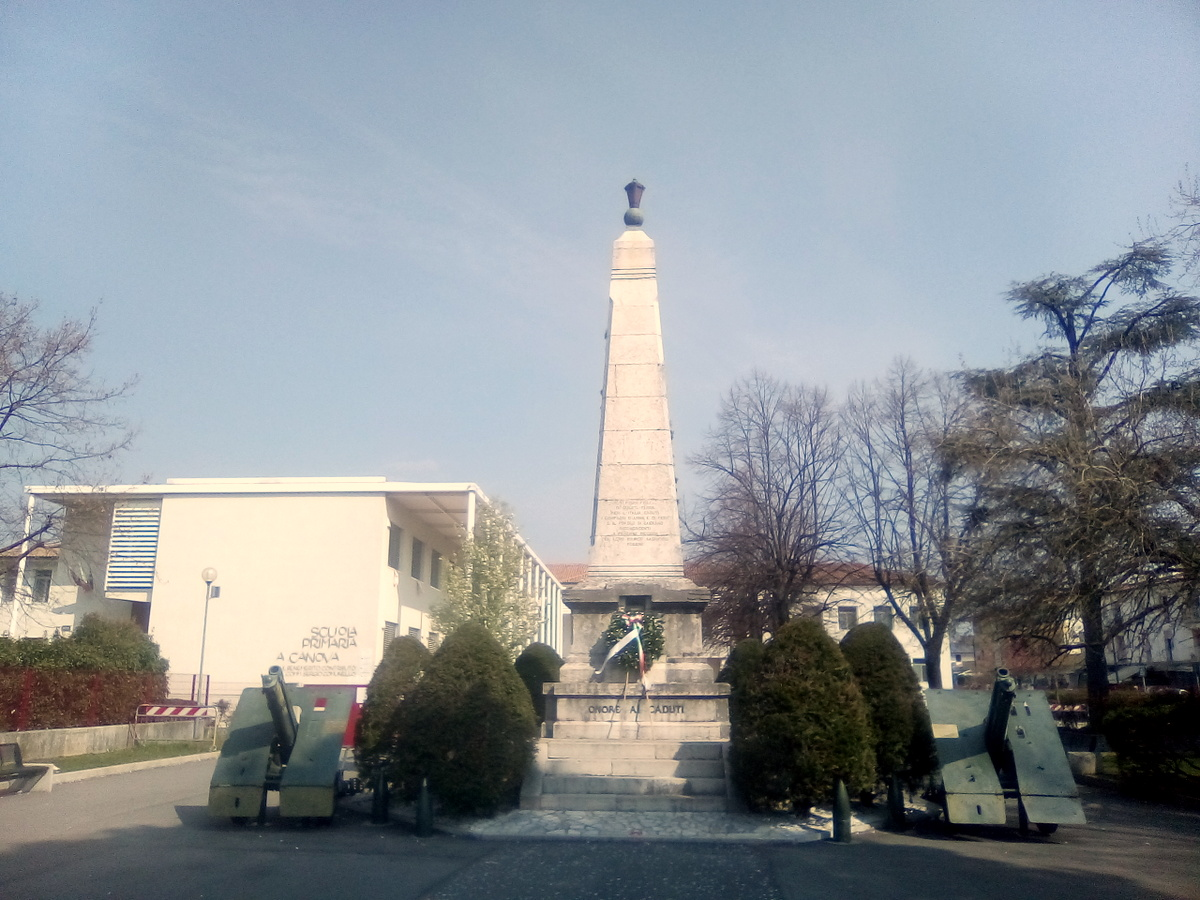
- War memorial in Piazza della Repubblica

- Location within Italy Location within Veneto
- Coordinates: 45°47′N 11°56′E
- Country: Italy
- Region: Veneto
- Province: Treviso (TV)

Area
  - Total: 12.09 km^{2} (4.67 sq mi)
- Elevation: 100 m (330 ft)

Population (31 October 2021)
  - Total: 7,813
  - Density: 646.2/km^{2} (1,674/sq mi)
- Demonym: Caeranesi
- Time zone: UTC+1 (CET)
  - Summer (DST): UTC+2 (CEST)
- Postal code: 31031
- Dialing code: 0423
- ISTAT code: 026006
- Patron saint: Our Lady of the Rosary
- Saint day: 7 October
- Website: Official website

Caerano di San Marco (Venetian: Carean de Sanmarco), sometimes simply known as Caerano, is a town with 7,813 inhabitants in the province of Treviso.

The territory is largely flat, with altitudes ranging from 91 m a.s.l. at 144 m. The landscape is characterized by the presence of a small relief, a natural continuation of Montello (known as Montelletto and locally as the Rive di Caerano), located north-east of the municipality. The area is naturally poor in waterways, but the water supply has been ensured since ancient times by a system of artificial canals deriving from the Piave. This is in particular the Canale di Caerano, better known as Brentella (Venetian: Brentèa), a branch of the Brentella di Pederobba.

Caerano San Marco borders the following municipalities: Altivole, Cornuda, Maser, Montebelluna.

== Recent history ==
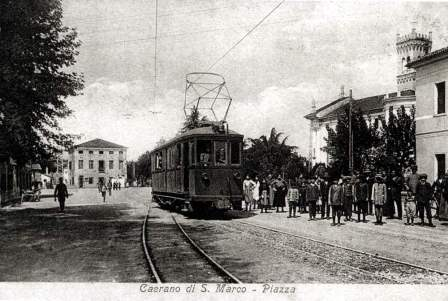
Old postcard of tram station (1915-1931)

In 1866 Caerano, like all the Veneto, adhered with a plebiscite to the king of Italy of Vittorio Emanuele II. Since then, the history of this town merges and merges with that of the whole nation, changing its name from Caerano to Caerano di San Marco in 1872 and obtaining full administrative autonomy in 1946. The Municipality of Caerano di San Marco was born, which in the second post-war period experienced its third and most important demographic increase, as well as a notable economic development, due to the rise in its territory of many companies and a large industrial complex specialized in articles of clothing, which gave the possibility of work to many thousands of workers and technicians.

== Monuments and places of interest ==
=== Church of San Marco Evangelista ===
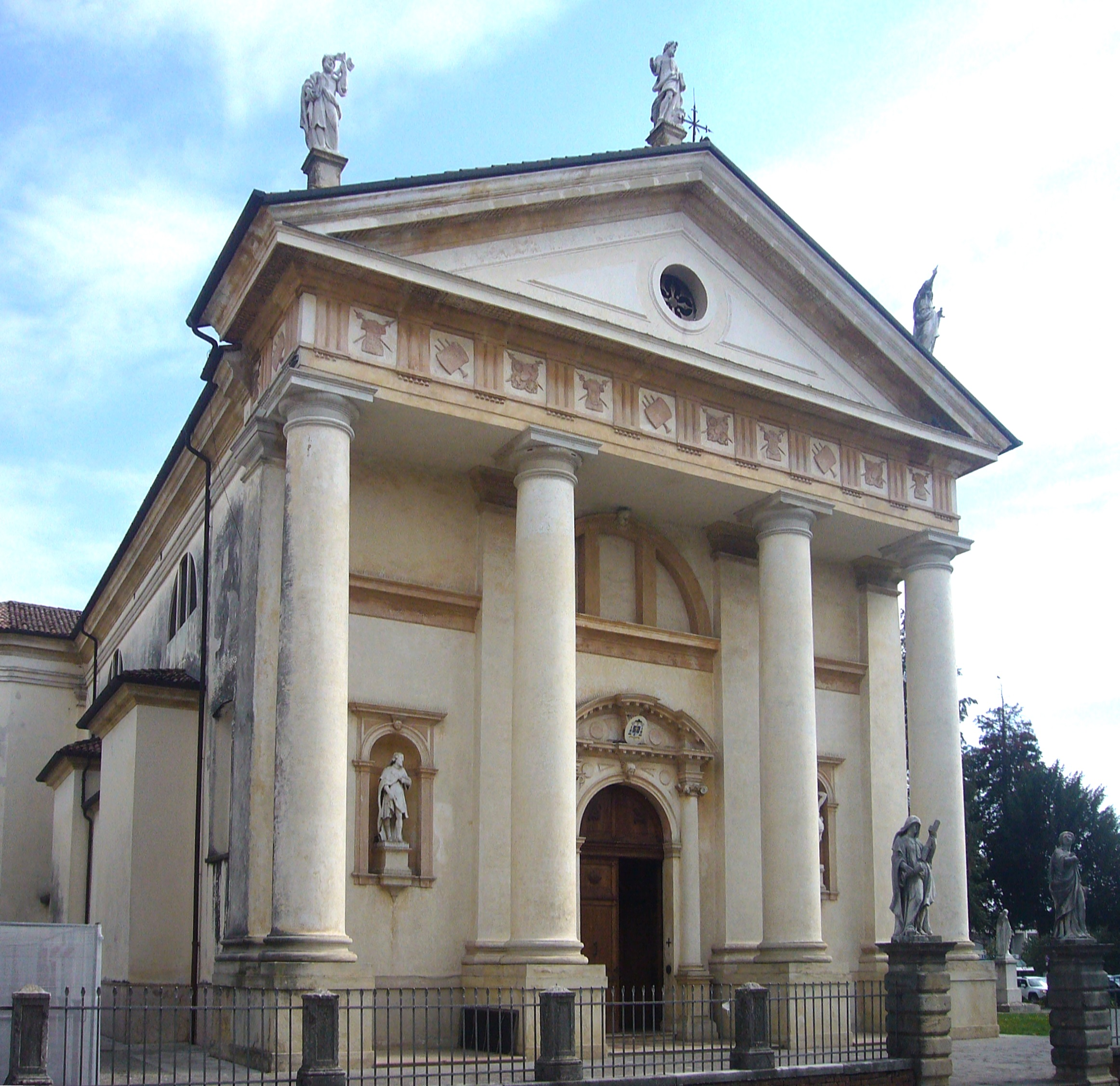
Chiesa Parrocchiale di San Marco

Towards the end of the seventeenth century the construction of the church began, which was enlarged between 1906 and 1908 with chapels and dome. Its facade is attributed to Giordano Riccati from Castelfranco Veneto and has Doric columns bearing the entablature and the frontispiece. Inside you can admire the beautiful ceiling fresco "Assumption of the Virgin" by Giambattista Canal, the "Crucifix with the two Marys" by Francesco Pittoni and "The Assumption Madonna with St. John the Baptist and St. Antonio Abate" by Ambrogio Bon. To enrich this heritage there is a precious organ from 1746 by Pietro Nacchini. Outside, around the church, there is the churchyard, once a cemetery, enclosed by a fence since 1886, the rectory with stucco from the 18th century and the bell tower rebuilt in 1903.

=== Villa Benzi Zecchini ===
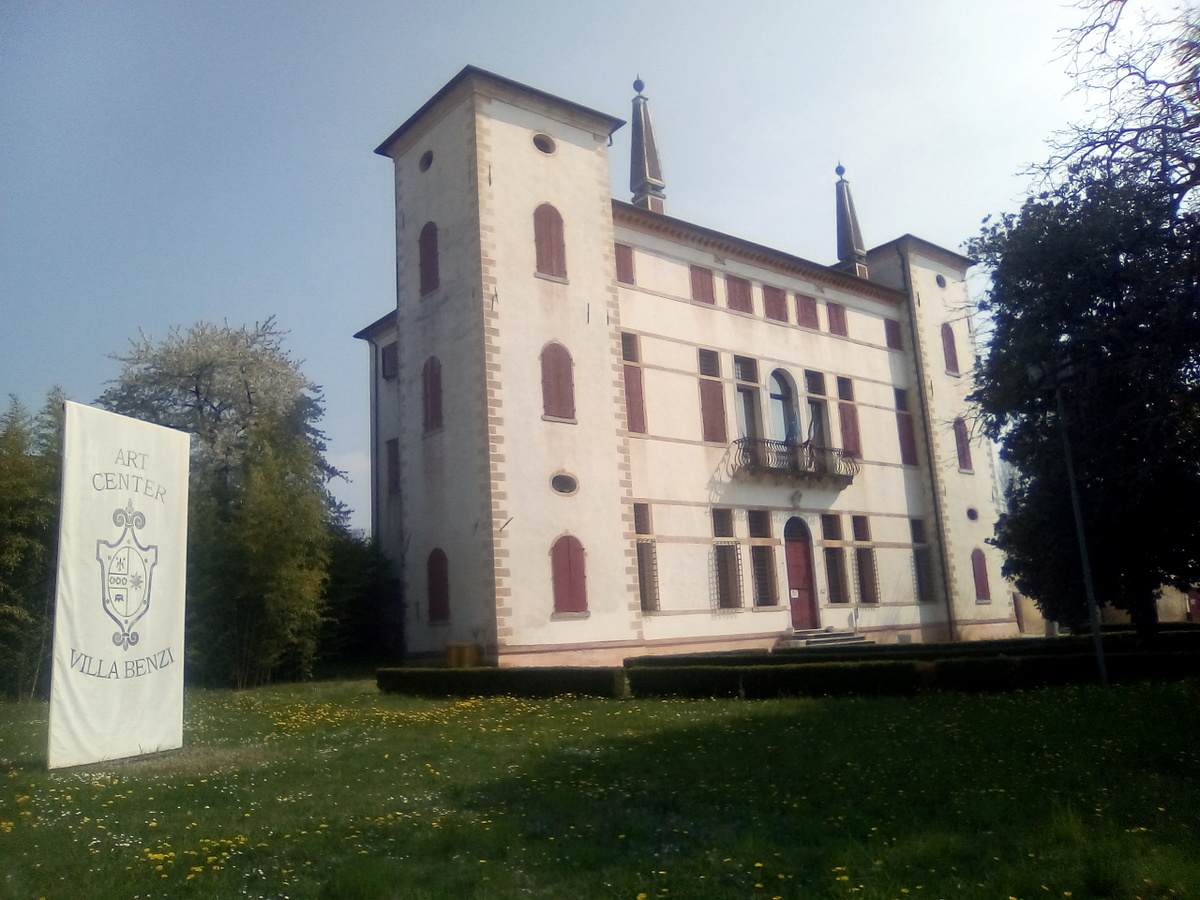
Villa Benzi Zecchini

In the sixteenth century a noble family decided to move to where Caerano di San Marco stands today, bought some land and built the complex now known as Villa Benzi Zecchini. Over the centuries there was a succession of owners of the villa until 1980, when the Municipality bought it. After a few years of complex restorations, the municipal administration decided to transform the villa into the cultural center of the Municipality of Caerano di San Marco and erect it as a foundation; at the same time the stables and granaries were converted into today's "Giuseppe Maffioli" theater. Today, the Villa Benzi Zecchini foundation deals with cultural activities, such as conventions, exhibitions, conferences, concerts and shows.

== Economy ==
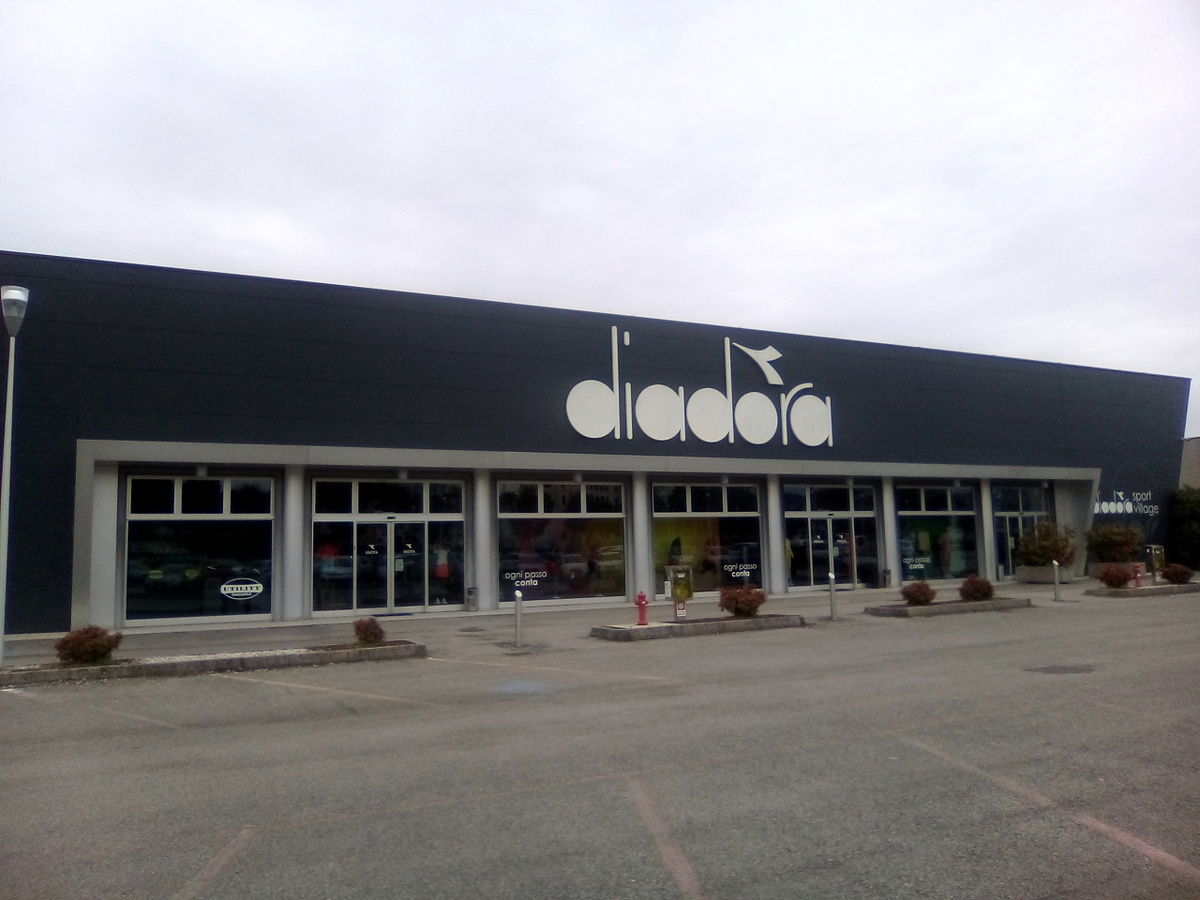
Diadora shop attached to the factory

Agriculture produces wine grapes, cereals and fruit. The city is located on the "DOC wine road" of the Asolo hills and Montello. Caerano is the birthplace of companies like Diadora born in the 1948, as an artisan workshop for making mountain and work boots, today a world district of sports footwear. SanRemo confezioni was born in the early 1950s by the Comunello brothers, first producing shirts and trousers then the classic quality "outerwear". Already after a few years it employed about a thousand employees who will reach the peak of 5,600 in the plants of Caerano, Vedelago, Ponzano and Belluno. In 1988 SanRemo is acquired by the Inghirami Textile Company group.

== Demographic evolution ==
Historical population

Year	Pop.	±%
1861	?	—
1871	1,822	—
1881	2,015	+10.6%
1901	2,487	+23.4%
1911	3,055	+22.8%
1921	3,272	+7.1%

Year	Pop.	±%
1931	3,439	+5.1%
1936	3,348	−2.6%
1951	4,136	+23.5%
1961	4,237	+2.4%
1971	5,125	+21.0%
1981	6,045	+18.0%

Year	Pop.	±%
1991	6,641	+9.9%
2001	7,027	+5.8%
2011	7,941	+13.0%
2021	7,849	−1.2%

Source: Data from ISTAT

=== Foreign ethnicities and minorities ===
As of December 31, 2022, foreigners residents in the municipality were 1,094, i.e. 14.0% of the population. The largest groups are shown below:

1. Romania 270
2. China 247
3. Morocco 133
4. Albania 101
5. North Macedonia 91
6. Senegal 32
7. Ukraine 32
8. Nigeria 26

== Twin towns ==
Caerano di San Marco is twinned with:

- Boissise-le-Roi, France, since 2002

== Notable people ==
- Dino Spadetto, footballer
- Giorgio Sernagiotto, racing driver
