= Renault PN =

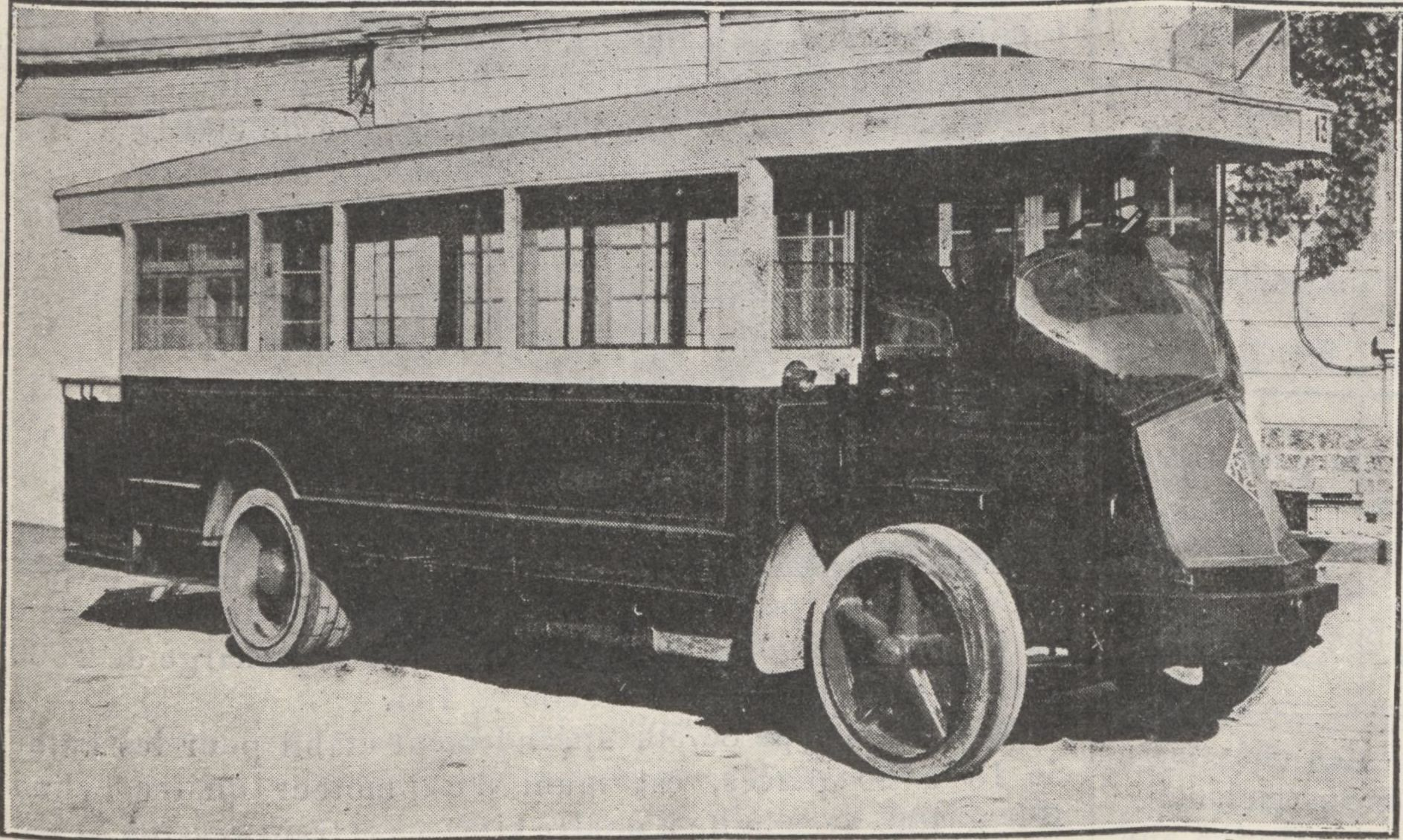
- A Renault PN

Overview
- Type: Transit bus
- Manufacturer: Renault
- Also called: Renault PY
- Production: 1926–1930
- Assembly: Boulogne-Billancourt, France

Body and chassis
- Layout: Front-engine, rear-wheel drive

Powertrain
- Transmission: 4-speed manual

Chronology
- Predecessor: Renault KX Express
- Successor: Renault TN

The Renault PN is a bus produced from 1926 until 1930 by the French manufacturer Renault for the Paris service. A variant for suburban transport was called Renault PY.

== History ==
In 1926, the Société des transports en commun de la région parisienne (STCRP), the predecessor of the RATP, made its first major order of buses to Renault, after a minor order of Renaults KX Express. The order consisted of 50 (47 delivered) new low-floor models with rear entry, called Renault PN. 330 PNs were delivered between 1927 and 1930. The PNs were on service until the 1950s.

In 1929, Renault introduced a PN version for suburban use, called PY. 25 were delivered and they were retired from service in 1939.

== Technical details ==
Both the PN and the PY have the same engine, a 5.03-litre flathead inline-four unit, with a power output between 30 metric horsepower (22 kW) at 1,000 rpm and 45 metric horsepower (33 kW) at 1,500 rpm. The radiator is located at the back of the engine. The buses' length is between 7,380 millimetres (291 in) (PY) and 8,190 millimetres (322 in) (PN), the width is of 2,380 millimetres (94 in) and the wheelbase of 4,380 millimetres (172 in). The buses have double wheels on the rear. The early models used solid rubber tyres that were later replaced by pneumatics, improving comfort. The gearbox is a 4-speed manual unit. The first vehicles delivered have cone clutch while later models incorporated a disc clutch. The capacity of the PN is of 39 passengers.

The main differences between the PN and the PY are related to the chassis structure. The PN has a forward control style design, with the driver sat over the engine and a low-entry platform on the rear. The PY has more conventional design, with the driver behind the engine compartment and passenger access through a sidefront door.
