= Nandy, Seine-et-Marne =

Nandy
- Commune
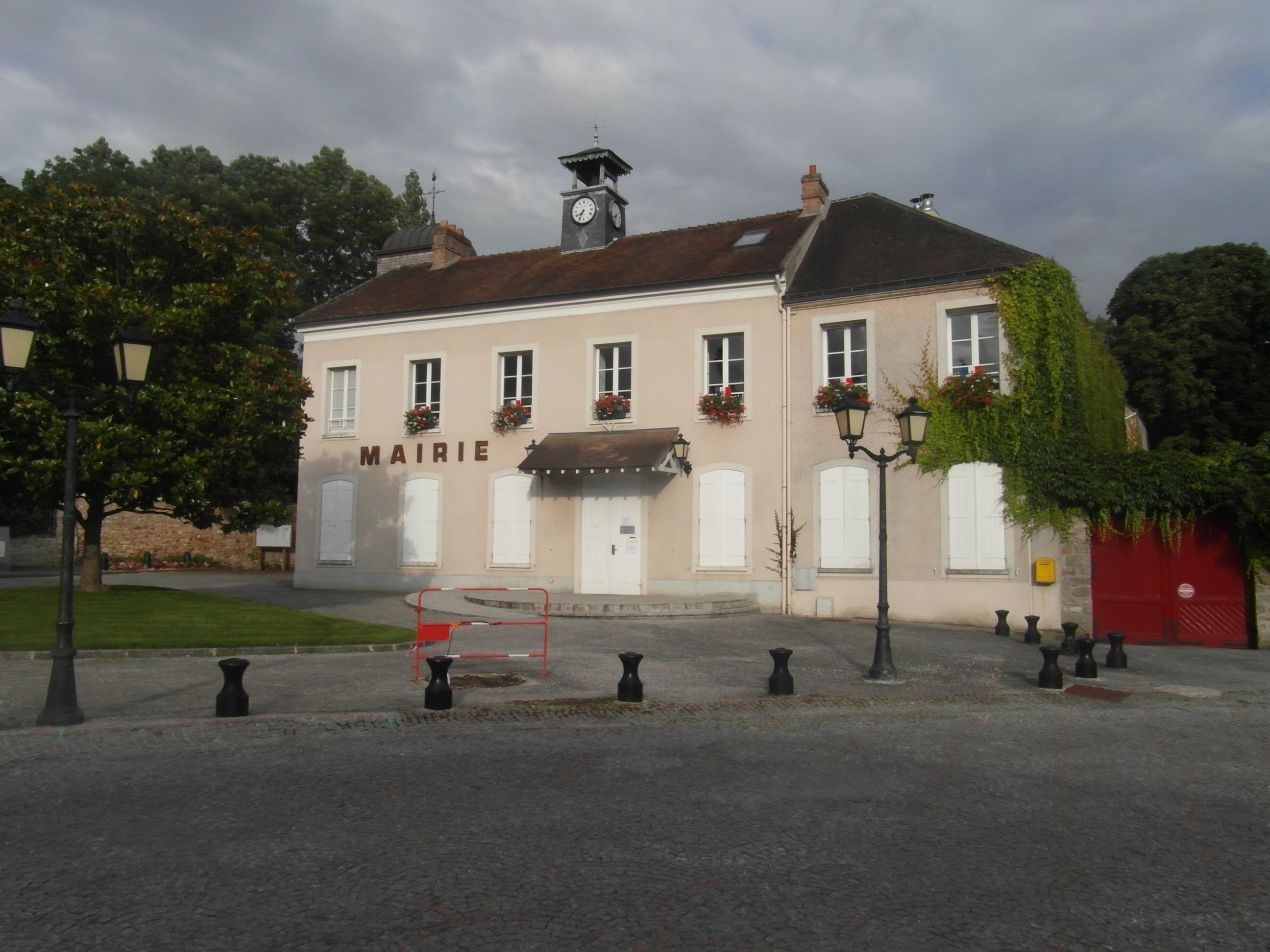
- The town hall in Nandy
- Location of Nandy
- Location within France Location within Île-de-France (region)
- Coordinates: 48°34′52″N 2°33′51″E
- Country: France
- Region: Île-de-France
- Department: Seine-et-Marne
- Arrondissement: Melun
- Canton: Saint-Fargeau-Ponthierry
- Intercommunality: CA Grand Paris Sud Seine-Essonne-Sénart

Government
  - Mayor (2020–2026): René Réthoré
- Area^{1}: 8.56 km^{2} (3.31 sq mi)
- Highest elevation: 87 m (285 ft)
- Lowest elevation: 37 m (121 ft)
- Population (2023): 6,350
  - Density: 742/km^{2} (1,920/sq mi)
- Time zone: UTC+01:00 (CET)
  - Summer (DST): UTC+02:00 (CEST)
- INSEE/Postal code: 77326 /77176
- ^{1} French Land Register data, which excludes lakes, ponds, glaciers > 1 km^{2} (0.386 sq mi or 247 acres) and river estuaries.

Nandy (French: [nɑ̃di]) is a commune in the Seine-et-Marne department in the Île-de-France region in north-central France.

== Demographics ==
Inhabitants are called Nandéens in French.

Historical population
Year	Pop.	±% p.a.
1968	349	—
1975	327	−0.93%
1982	1,548	+24.87%
1990	5,429	+16.98%
1999	6,159	+1.41%
2007	5,903	−0.53%
2012	5,888	−0.05%
2017	6,042	+0.52%
2023	6,350	+0.83%
Source: INSEE

== See also ==
- Communes of the Seine-et-Marne department
