= Diadora =

Italian sportswear and footwear manufacturing company

Coordinates: 45.7812281°N 12.0092107°E

- Type: Subsidiary
- Industry: Sports equipment
- Founded: 1948; 78 years ago
- Founder: Marcello Danieli
- Headquarters: Caerano di San Marco, Veneto, Italy
- Area served: Worldwide
- Key people: Enrico Moretti Polegato
- Products: Sportswear, footwear
- Parent: Geox S.p.A.
- Website: diadora.com

Diadora is an Italian sportswear and footwear manufacturing company based in Caerano di San Marco (Veneto), subsidiary of Geox, founded in 1948. Diadora produces football boots and athletic shoes, as well as a range of apparel that includes t-shirts, polo shirts, hoodies, jackets, leggings, shorts, and compression garments. Diadora also commercializes football balls in the US market. In 2020, Geox filed for bankruptcy in Canada.

== History ==
=== Origins and development ===
Diadora was founded in 1948 by Marcello Danieli. The name of the company is a likely development of de Iadera ('from Zadar', Iadera being the ancient name of the Dalmatian town). Danieli managed to launch his first product, mountain climbing boots.

The mid-1970s also marked Diadora's entry into the football category, aided by Roberto Bettega, who provided consulting information. The company also added the tennis market, signing endorsement agreements with Björn Borg.

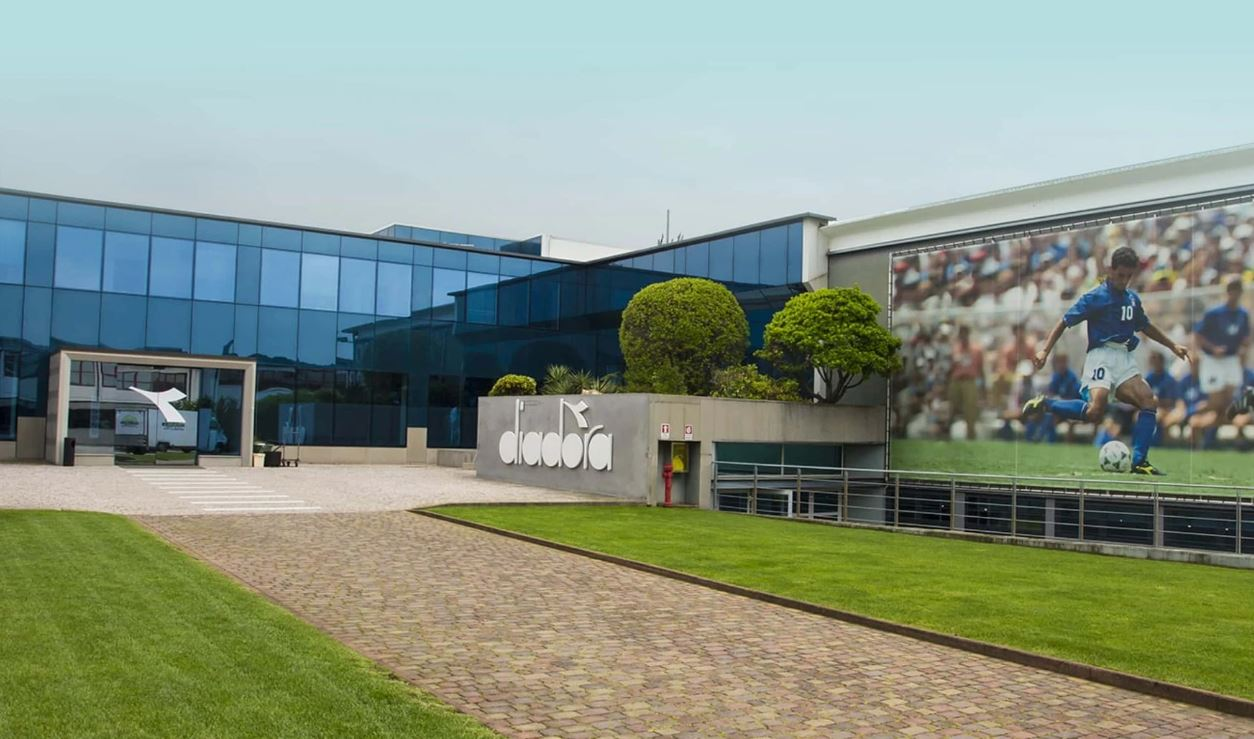
Diadora HQ at Caerano di San Marco

=== The 1980s and 1990s ===
As English soccer teams started competing more often in continental European competitions in the early 1980's, Diadora branded shoes became an essential part of British football hooligan "casual culture" and were considered a status symbol, as their rarity outside of Italy granted the wearer unrivalled prestige amongst other football fans.

AC Milan striker Marco van Basten became the face of the company in the late 1980s, and launched his own personalized football boots, the San Siro Van Basten. Juventus striker Roberto Baggio became the face of the company in the 1990s, and launched his own personalized football boots, the Matchwinner.

Diadora also dabbled with rugby union, making the kits for Otago Rugby Union in New Zealand. The Diadora Otago jersey is one of the rarest and most sought after rugby jersey in the world.

In the 1990s, Diadora was also the official kit supplier of several Italian football clubs, including AS Roma for three seasons, between 1997 and 2000.

=== The 2000s and 2010s ===
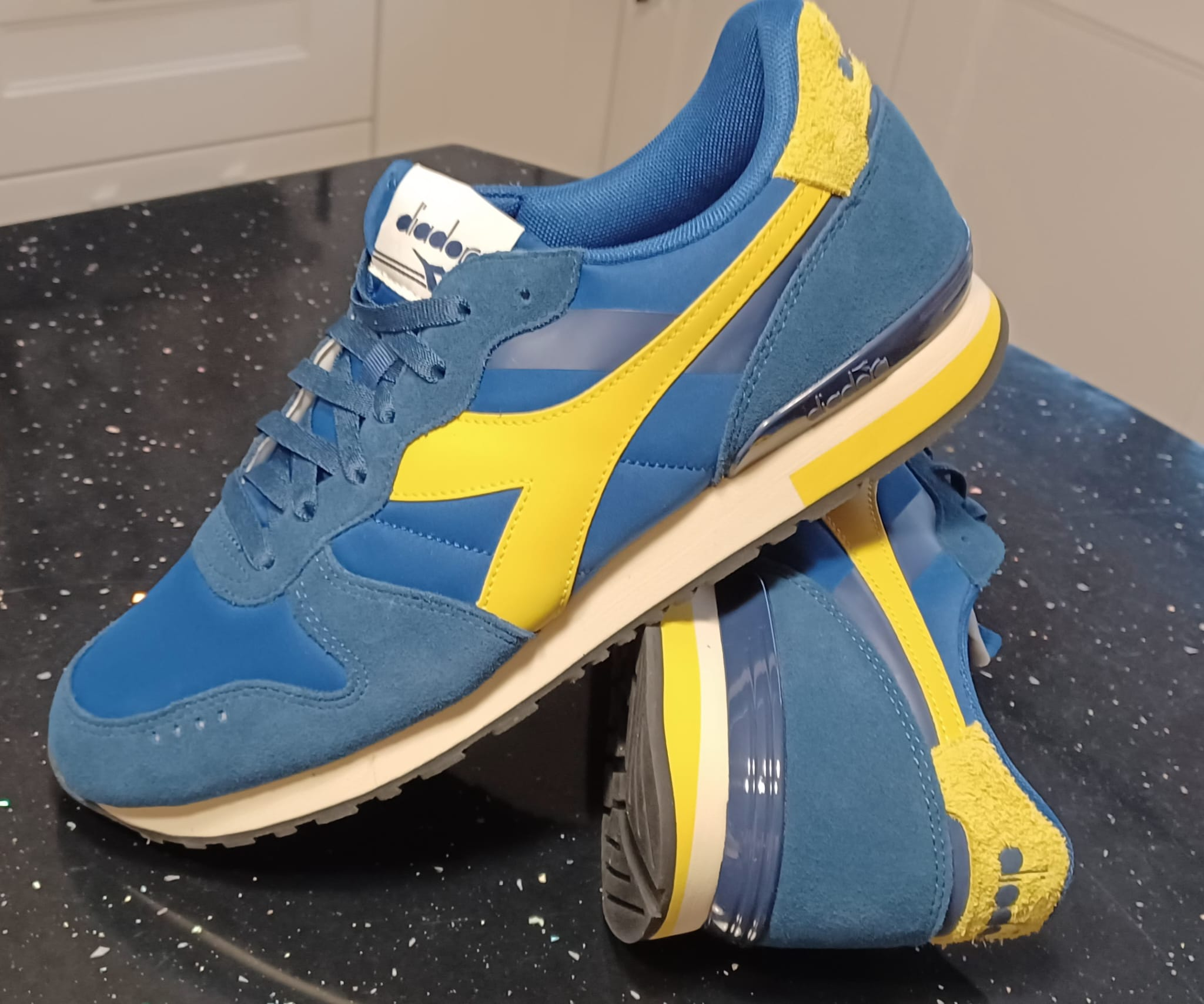
Diadora CAMARO M2 SMOOTH Suede leather sneaker in Dutch Blue

Between 2003 and 2007, Diadora was again the official kit supplier of AS Roma. In 2008, Diadora SpA signed a joint venture with Win Hanverky Holdings Limited, forming a new company called "Winor International Company Limited" that operates the trademark "Diadora" in China to manufacture, design, promote, distribute, and sell products bearing the brand in the country.

In June 2009, Diadora reached an agreement with Italian shoe-making company Geox's founder and chairman Mario Moretti Polegato to buy its assets through his family's investment arm, LIR.

==== The 2020s–present ====
On September 8, 2020, Geox Canada Inc. filed for bankruptcy in Canada.

Right now, Diadora is the kit maker of Norwegian Eliteserien club Viking FK At the 2025 season, Diadora made a return to the Brazilian football, providing kits for Coritiba and Náutico.

In July 2026, Diadora officially signed a professional deal with runner Marco Langon. Langon had previously signed a name, image and likeness (NIL) contract with Diadora in April 2025, while competing for Villanova University.

== Sponsorships ==
The following list of clubs are sponsored by Diadora:

=== Athletes ===
- (United States) Marco Langon

=== Association football ===
==== Club teams ====
- (Brazil) Coritiba
- (Brazil) Náutico
- (Norway) Viking FK
- (Tanzania) Simba

== Past sponsorships ==
=== Association football ===
==== Club teams ====
- (Italy) AS Roma (1997–2000, 2003–07)
