= Canton of Saint-Fargeau-Ponthierry =

Coordinates: 48.5333°N 2.5500°E

Saint-Fargeau-Ponthierry
- Canton
- Country: France
- Region: Île-de-France
- Department: Seine-et-Marne
- No. of communes: {{{nbcomm}}}
- Area: 55.09 km^{2} (21.27 sq mi)
- Population (2023): 55,180
  - Density: 1,002/km^{2} (2,594/sq mi)
- INSEE code: 77 19

The canton of Saint-Fargeau-Ponthierry is a French administrative division, located in the arrondissement of Melun, in the Seine-et-Marne département (Île-de-France région).

It consists of the following communes:

- Boissise-le-Roi
- Dammarie-les-Lys
- Nandy
- Pringy
- Saint-Fargeau-Ponthierry
- Seine-Port

== See also ==
- Cantons of the Seine-et-Marne department
- Communes of the Seine-et-Marne department
