= Dino Spadetto =

Italian footballer (born 1950)

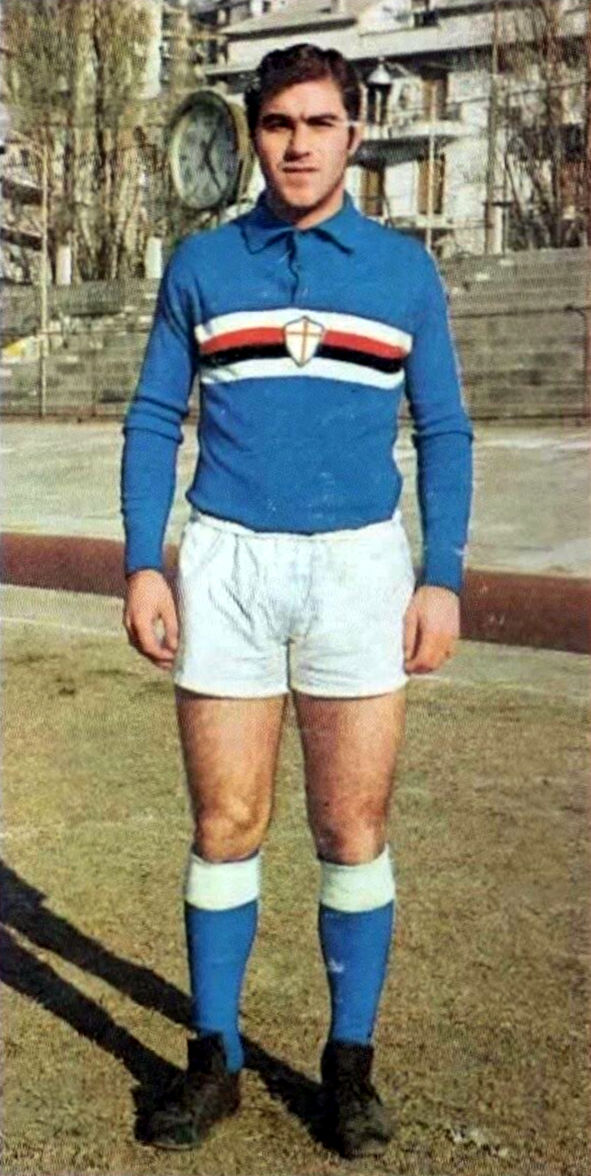
- Spadetto with Sampdoria in 1970

Personal information
- Date of birth: 25 January 1950 (age 76)
- Place of birth: Caerano di San Marco, Italy
- Height: 1.77 m (5 ft 9 1/2 in)
- Position: Striker

Senior career*
| Years | Team | Apps | (Gls) |
| 1965–1966 | Montebelluna | | |
| 1966–1969 | Internazionale | 5 | (2) |
| 1969–1970 | Bari | 17 | (1) |
| 1970–1973 | Sampdoria | 24 | (6) |
| 1973–1974 | Parma | 15 | (0) |
| 1974–1975 | Venezia | 20 | (2) |
| 1975–1979 | Juveterranova Gela | | |
| 1979–1981 | Acireale | 57 | (5) |
- * Club domestic league appearances and goals

Dino Spadetto (born 25 January 1950 in Caerano di San Marco) is an Italian former professional footballer who played as a striker.
