= Boissise-le-Roi =

- Commune
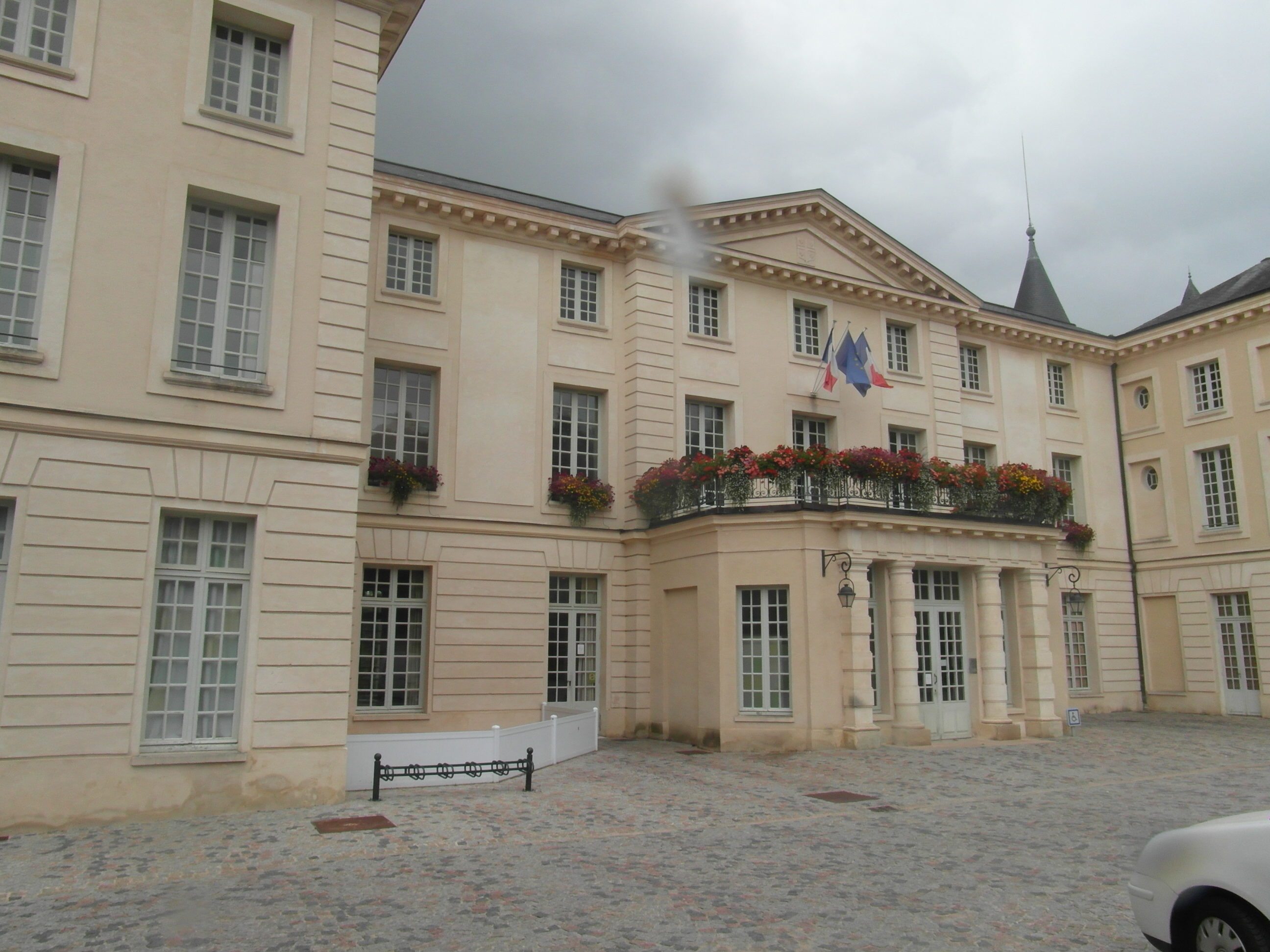
- The town hall of Boissise-le-Roi

- Coat of arms
- Location of Boissise-le-Roi
- Location within France Location within Île-de-France (region)
- Coordinates: 48°31′44″N 2°34′25″E
- Country: France
- Region: Île-de-France
- Department: Seine-et-Marne
- Arrondissement: Melun
- Canton: Saint-Fargeau-Ponthierry
- Intercommunality: CA Melun Val de Seine

Government
  - Mayor (2020–2026): Véronique Chagnat
- Area^{1}: 7.09 km^{2} (2.74 sq mi)
- Highest elevation: 83 m (272 ft)
- Lowest elevation: 37 m (121 ft)
- Population (2023): 3,941
  - Density: 556/km^{2} (1,440/sq mi)
- Demonym: Régiboissiens
- Time zone: UTC+01:00 (CET)
  - Summer (DST): UTC+02:00 (CEST)
- INSEE/Postal code: 77040 /77310
- Website: www.mairie-boissise-le-roi.fr
- ^{1} French Land Register data, which excludes lakes, ponds, glaciers > 1 km^{2} (0.386 sq mi or 247 acres) and river estuaries.

Boissise-le-Roi (French pronunciation: [bwasiz lə ʁwa]; lit. 'Boissise-the-King') is a commune in the Seine-et-Marne department in the Île-de-France region in northern France. It is on the left bank of the Seine, west of Melun. The church, the château and its park are listed monuments.

== Population ==
Historical population
Year	Pop.	±% p.a.
1968	1,030	—
1975	1,818	+8.46%
1982	2,676	+5.68%
1990	3,126	+1.96%
1999	3,653	+1.75%
2007	3,619	−0.12%
2012	3,696	+0.42%
2017	3,775	+0.42%
2023	3,941	+0.72%
Source: INSEE

The inhabitants are called Régiboissiens (masculine) and Régiboissiennes (feminine) in French.

== Transport ==
Boissise-le-Roi station is served by RER D.

== Twin towns ==
Boissise-le-Roi is twinned with:

- Caerano di San Marco, Italy, since 2002
- Alvelos, in Barcelos, Portugal

== See also ==
- Communes of the Seine-et-Marne department
