= Renault TN =

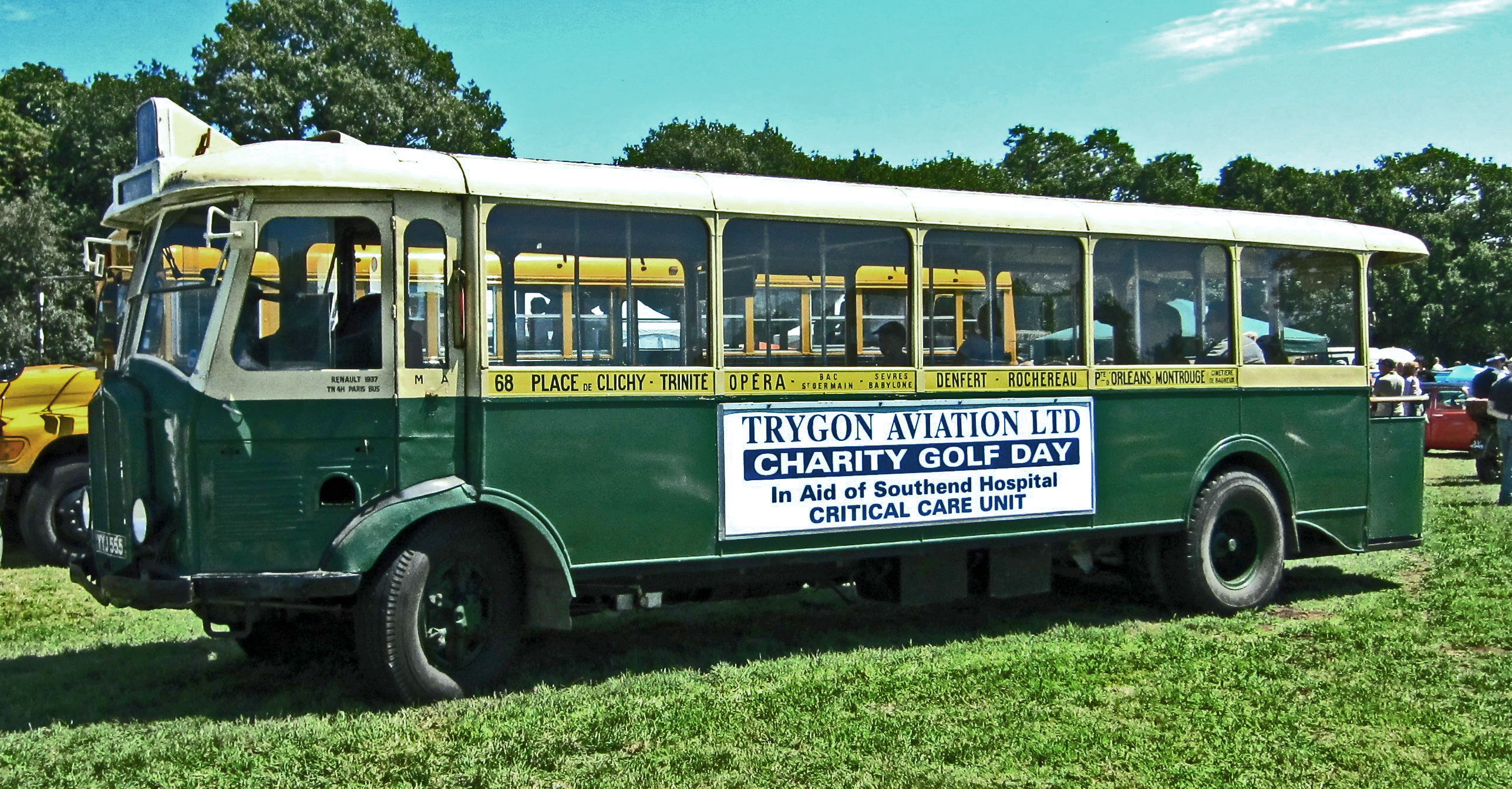
- A Renault TNH4 of 1937

Overview
- Type: Transit bus
- Manufacturer: Renault
- Production: 1931–1971
- Assembly: Boulogne-Billancourt, France

Body and chassis
- Layout: Front-engine, rear-wheel drive

Powertrain
- Transmission: 4-speed manual

Chronology
- Predecessor: Renault PN

The Renault TN is a range of buses produced from 1931 until 1971 for the Paris service. They have been described by Le Monde as a "symbol of a Paris era".

== History ==
In 1931, the first TN model, the TN4, a bus with a length of 9.5 metres, was introduced at the request of Société des transports en commun de la région parisienne (STCRP), the predecessor of the RATP. The TN4 introduced the radiator in front of the engine instead of behind as used on previous Renault buses. The TN4, more powerful and with a larger capacity (up to 50 passengers) that previous Parisian transports, led to the final decline of the Paris tramway that disappeared in 1937.

The first TNs had an open platform. The TN4 introduced versions with various inline-four engines of 58 metric horsepower (43 kW) (TN4A, TN4B, TN4C, TN4F) and received some front-end restyling. In 1932, a TN with an inline-six engine of 68 metric horsepower (50 kW), the TN6 (also with open platform), was introduced. Its versions (TN6A, TN6C 1 and 2) were used for suburban transport. The TN6C 1 and 2 had a closed platform from 1936 onwards.

In 1935 Renault unveiled a new TN4, the TN4H. This 50-passenger bus adopted a closed platform, a longer wheelbase, a forward control cabin and a new suspension. A significant number of TNs were requisitioned by the French military during World War II. The main rival for the TNs during that era was the similar K 63 bus produced by Panhard.

After the war, all the TNs in service (6A, 6C2, 4B, 4C, 4E, 4H) were refurbished, resulting in standardised interior fitting and decor. By the 1950s, almost all the TNs had adopted a more closed cabin to protect the driver. The TNs were slowly phased out: TN4B in 1959, the TN6 in 1969, the TN4F in 1970 and the TN4H in 1971.

== Model ==
Solido produced a die-cast model of the TN6C version from the 1960s onward. This model was made of metal and plastic and was to a scale of 1:50.
