= Pringy, Seine-et-Marne =

Pringy
- Commune
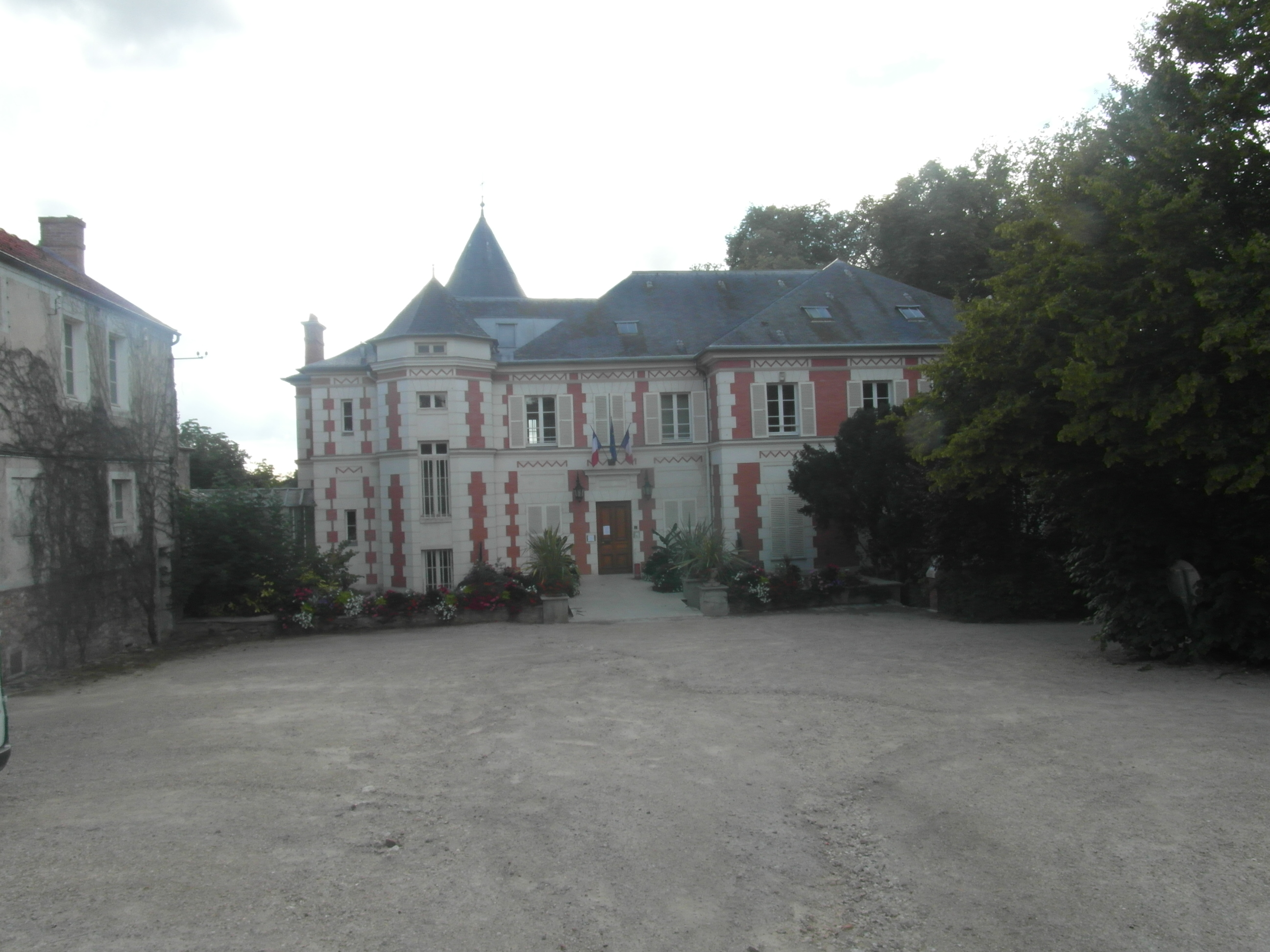
- The town hall in Pringy

- Coat of arms
- Location of Pringy
- Location within France Location within Île-de-France (region)
- Coordinates: 48°31′19″N 2°33′35″E
- Country: France
- Region: Île-de-France
- Department: Seine-et-Marne
- Arrondissement: Melun
- Canton: Saint-Fargeau-Ponthierry
- Intercommunality: CA Melun Val de Seine

Government
  - Mayor (2020–2026): Éric Chomaudon
- Area^{1}: 4.10 km^{2} (1.58 sq mi)
- Highest elevation: 79 m (259 ft)
- Lowest elevation: 40 m (130 ft)
- Population (2023): 3,864
  - Density: 942/km^{2} (2,440/sq mi)
- Time zone: UTC+01:00 (CET)
  - Summer (DST): UTC+02:00 (CEST)
- INSEE/Postal code: 77378 /77310
- ^{1} French Land Register data, which excludes lakes, ponds, glaciers > 1 km^{2} (0.386 sq mi or 247 acres) and river estuaries.

Pringy (French pronunciation: [pʁɛ̃ʒi]) is a commune in the Seine-et-Marne department in the Île-de-France region in north-central France. Pringy is twinned with the English town of Pucklechurch, near Bristol.

== Population ==
Historical population
Year	Pop.	±% p.a.
1968	1,045	—
1975	1,317	+3.36%
1982	1,792	+4.50%
1990	2,253	+2.90%
1999	2,316	+0.31%
2007	2,554	+1.23%
2012	2,549	−0.04%
2017	2,924	+2.78%
2023	3,864	+4.76%
Source: INSEE

The inhabitants are called Pringyaciens in French.

== See also ==
- Communes of the Seine-et-Marne department
