= Saint-Fargeau-Ponthierry =

- Commune
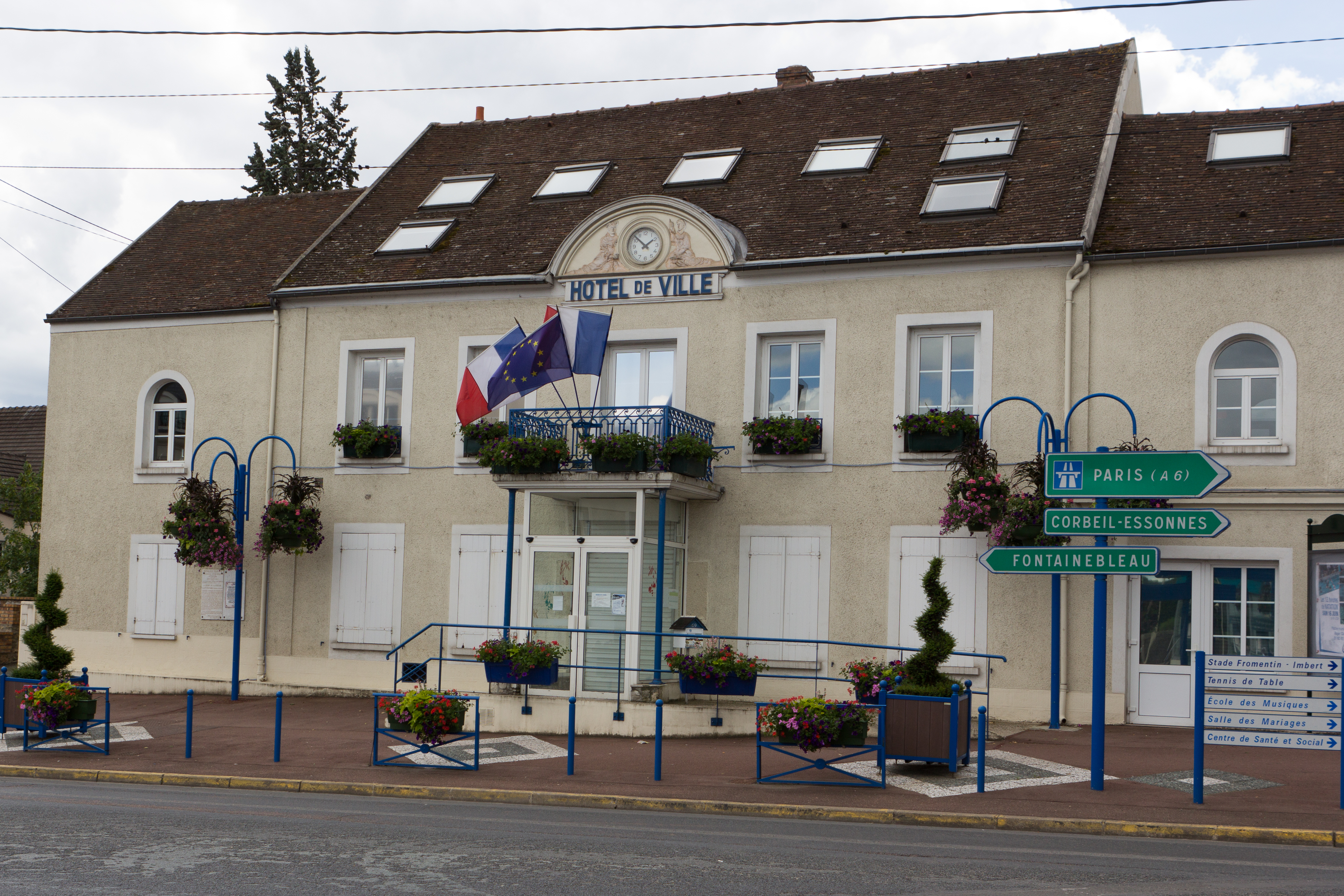
- The town hall in Saint-Fargeau-Ponthierry

- Coat of arms
- Location of Saint-Fargeau-Ponthierry
- Location within France Location within Île-de-France (region)
- Coordinates: 48°32′08″N 2°31′27″E
- Country: France
- Region: Île-de-France
- Department: Seine-et-Marne
- Arrondissement: Melun
- Canton: Saint-Fargeau-Ponthierry
- Intercommunality: CA Melun Val de Seine

Government
  - Mayor (2020–2026): Séverine Felix-Boron
- Area^{1}: 16.57 km^{2} (6.40 sq mi)
- Highest elevation: 86 m (282 ft)
- Lowest elevation: 37 m (121 ft)
- Population (2023): 15,724
  - Density: 948.9/km^{2} (2,458/sq mi)
- Time zone: UTC+01:00 (CET)
  - Summer (DST): UTC+02:00 (CEST)
- INSEE/Postal code: 77407 /77310
- ^{1} French Land Register data, which excludes lakes, ponds, glaciers > 1 km^{2} (0.386 sq mi or 247 acres) and river estuaries.

Saint-Fargeau-Ponthierry (French: [sɛ̃ faʁʒo pɔ̃tjɛʁi]) is a commune in the Seine-et-Marne department in the Île-de-France region in north-central France.

== Demographics ==
Inhabitants of Saint-Fargeau-Ponthierry are called Thierrypontains or Ferréopontains in French.

Historical population
Year	Pop.	±% p.a.
1968	5,611	—
1975	7,884	+4.98%
1982	9,553	+2.78%
1990	10,560	+1.26%
1999	11,224	+0.68%
2007	12,180	+1.03%
2012	13,170	+1.58%
2017	14,206	+1.53%
2023	15,724	+1.71%
Source: INSEE

== See also ==
- Communes of the Seine-et-Marne department
