= Pays Briard bus network =

Bus network in Seine-et-Marne, France

Pays Briard
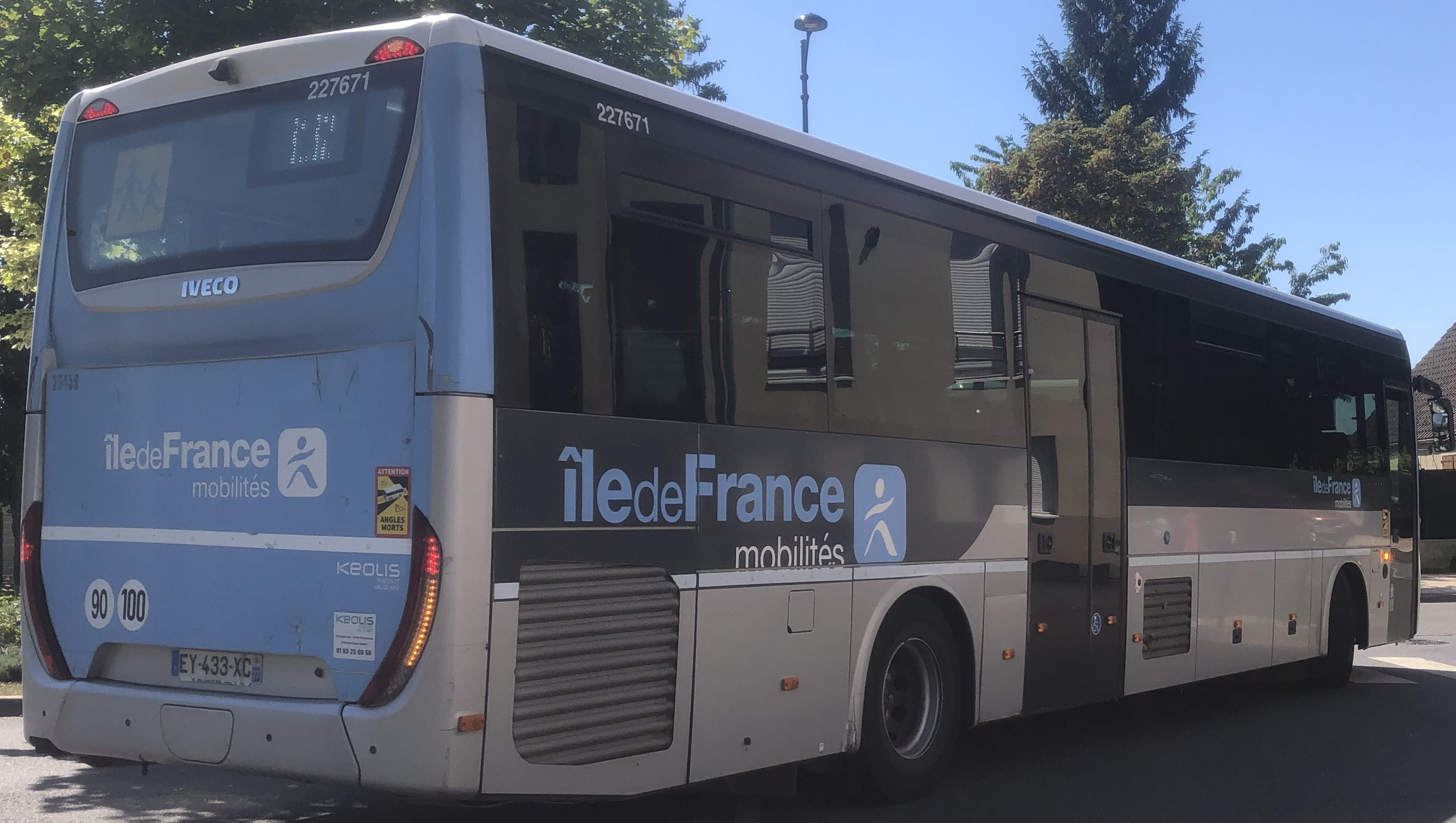
- Iveco Crossway High Value n°227671 serving on line 3132 at bus stop Collège Barthélémy, Nangis.
- Parent: Île-de-France Mobilités
- Founded: January 1, 2023
- Service area: Seine-et-Marne: (Andrezel, Argentières, Aubepierre-Ozouer-le-Repos, Beauvoir, Bernay-Vilbert, Blandy, Bombon, Brie-Comte-Robert, Champdeuil, Champeaux, La Chapelle-Gauthier, La Chapelle-Iger, Les Chapelles-Bourbon, Châtres, Chaumes-en-Brie, Chessy, Chevry-Cossigny, Combs-la-Ville, Coubert, Coulommiers, Courpalay, Courquetaine, Courtomer, Crèvecœur-en-Brie, Crisenoy, Évry-Grégy-sur-Yerre, Férolles-Attilly, Fontenay-Trésigny, Fouju, Gastins, Grandpuits-Bailly-Carrois, Grisy-Suisnes, Gretz-Armainvilliers, Guignes, La Houssaye-en-Brie, Lésigny, Limoges-Fourches, Lissy, Liverdy-en-Brie, Lumigny-Nesles-Ormeaux, Maincy, Marles-en-Brie, Melun, Moisenay, Montereau-sur-le-Jard, Mormant, Nangis, Neufmoutiers-en-Brie, Noisiel, Ozoir-la-Ferrière, Ozouer-le-Voulgis, Pécy, Pézarches, Le Plessis-Feu-Aussoux, Presles-en-Brie, Quiers, Rozay-en-Brie, Rubelles, Saint-Germain-Laxis, Saint-Méry, Santeny, Servon, Soignolles-en-Brie, Solers, Touquin, Tournan-en-Brie, Vaudoy-en-Brie, Vaux-le-Pénil, Verneuil-l'Étang, Vert-Saint-Denis, Voinsles, Voisenon, Yèbles); Val-de-Marne: (Boissy-Saint-Léger, Bonneuil-sur-Marne, Créteil, Limeil-Brévannes, Mandres-les-Roses, Périgny, Villecresnes)
- Routes: 423 3101 3102 3103 3104; 3105 3106 3107 3108 3109; 3110 3111 3112 3113 3114; 3115 3116 3117 3118 3119; 3120 3121 3122 3123 3124; 3125 3126 3127 3128 3129; 3130 3131 3132 3133 3134; 3135 3136 3137 3138 3139; 3140 3141 3142 3143 3144; 3145 3146 3147 3148 7716
- Operator: Keolis (Keolis Portes et Val de Brie)
- Website: Pays Briard bus network website

Pays Briard is a French bus network run by Île-de-France Mobilités, operated by Keolis through his subsidiary Keolis Portes et Val de Brie from January 1, 2021.

It consists of 49 lines which mainly serve the west of Seine-et-Marne and to a lesser extent Val-de-Marne. The network is also completed with three night lines and two demand-responsive transports.

== History ==
The establishment in 1946 of the company Les Cars Bizière in Seine-et-Marne, bought by the Transdev group in 2002 then renamed Transdev N'4 Mobilités in 2007, alone developed several bus networks in the west of the department. Indeed, the networks Stigo (Syndicat de transports intercommunal de Gretz-Armainvilliers et Ozoir-la-Ferrière) and Sol'R respectively served the Les Portes Briardes Entre Villes et Forêts community of communes and the Val Bréon community of communes from 2005<. The "Yerres - Brie Centrale" and "Arlequin" networks respectively served the center of Seine-et-Marne and to a lesser extent, Val-de-Marne.

Several lines of these networks, partly operated by the subsidiary Transdev N'4 Mobilités, merged during the creation of the Pays Briard bus network on January 1, 2023, the date the network began operating under competitor Keolis.

=== Network development ===
==== Sol'R bus network ====
Since September 2, 2013, several additional weekday runs have been distributed across the lines 3, 7, 209, 309 et 409.

On September 1, 2014, due to changes in school zoning, the line 3 saw its morning run twice, and the line 409 was reinforced with two additional runs in the morning and one on Wednesday midday.

The thirteen lines were operated by Transdev Darche Gros and Transdev N'4 Mobilités and were only in service from Monday to Friday (with the exception of the line 21, which was also operated on Saturdays), before their transfer to the new public service delegation.

==== Stigo bus network ====
Stigo (Syndicat de transports intercommunal de Gretz-Armainvilliers et Ozoir-la-Ferrière) is a former bus network operated by Transdev N'4 Mobilités, beginning his service in 2010.

On November 7, 2011, the line 11 was created, providing a link between the municipalities of Ozoir-la-Ferrière and Gretz-Armainvilliers.

From September 2, 2013, following the extension of Lycée Clément-Ader in Tournan-en-Brie, the line 11 has seen the extension of its evening services to the high school without the addition of additional services. On the same date, the line 201 is extended from Ozoir-la-Ferrière to Lésigny via Férolles-Attilly, these municipalities previously only had a feeder service to schools. The extension of eleven services during morning and evening peak hours and the creation of eight services during off-peak hours will connect these municipalities to the urban and administrative center of Ozoir-la-Ferrière. This reinforcement required the acquisition of a standard bus. The line 11 service was extended on September 1, 2014.

On January 8, 2018, during the restructuring of the Sit'bus bus network, the lines 8 and 202 were replaced by the new line A. The line 203 was absorbed by a route modification of the line 502.

On January 6, 2020, the line 201 is split into two lines 200 and 201, the line 11 no longer serves Ozoir-la-Ferrière and a demand-responsive transport is implemented.

On January 1, 2023, Keolis takes over the operation of the four lines of this former network, and makes several changes, notably the extension of the operation of some lines in the evenings.

==== Yerres - Brie Centrale bus network ====
Before the opening to the competition, sixteen lines of Yerres - Brie Centrale were operated by Transdev Darche Gros and Transdev N'4 Mobilités.

==== Arlequin bus network ====
Before the opening to the competition, eight lines were operated by four different subsidiaries of Transdev : Transdev N'4 Mobilités, Transdev Darche Gros, Transdev SETRA and Transdev Saint-Fargeau-Ponthierry. Only the line 12 was not transferred to Pays Briard bus network, instead being transferred to Marne et Seine bus network.

=== Opening to the competition ===
Due to the opening up of public transport to competition in Île-de-France, the Pays Briard bus network was created on January 1, 2025, corresponding to public service delegation number 13 established by Île-de-France Mobilités. A call for tenders was therefore launched by the organizing authority to designate a company that will operate the network for a period of six years. It was finally Keolis, via its subsidiary Keolis Portes et Val de Brie, which was designated during the board of directors on May 25, 2020.

At the date of its opening to competition, the network consisted of the lines 11, 18, 200 and 201 of Stigo, lines 3, 7, 10, 17, 21, 28 (abc), 33, 121, 209, 309 and 409 of Sol'R, lines 4, 20, 23, 24, 32, 34 (ab), 35 (abcd), 37 (abc, rpi) of Yerres - Brie Centrale, lines 5, 6, 7, 10, 14, 21 and 30 (abc) of Arlequin, line 39 of TRAMY, line 23 of Mobilien, and line 16 of the Seine-et-Marne Express. The contract also includes the Noctilien line N142.

Since the network was created, users have noticed numerous malfunctions, such as unserviced departures and drivers not serving some stops, and the lack of drivers.

On September 4, 2023, the line 7 serving Brie-Comte-Robert is split into five lines (1, 2, 3S, 4S and 5S).

==== Network renaming ====
Since February 17, 2025, the Pays Briard network has been implementing the new single regional numbering system planned by Île-de-France Mobilités to eliminate duplication. Bus lines in the Pays Briard network will now begin with the area code "31", followed by two additional digits, and Express lines will begin with the number of the department to which the network belongs, in this case "77" for the Seine-et-Marne department, followed by two additional digits.

The correspondence between the old and new numbers is as follows:

Network renaming
Old	New
23	423
1	3101
2	3102
3	3103
4	3104
5	3105
6	3106
7	3107
3S	3108
209	3109
10	3110
11	3111
11	3112
11	3113
14	3114
121	3115
11S	3116
17	3117
18	3118
21°	3119
20	3120
21	3121
28B	3122
23°	3123
24	3124
28C	3125
30B	3126
30C	3127
28A	3128
34B	3129
30A	3130
35B	3131
32	3132
33	3133
34A	3134
35A	3135
35C	3136
37A	3137
35D	3138
39	3139
37B	3140
4S	3141
5S	3142
37C	3143
200	3144
201	3145
309	3146
409	3147
10°	3148
16	7716

== Routes ==
=== Main routes ===
Note: Some lines have many services.

Image	Line	First direction	Second direction
	423	Créteil — Préfecture du Val-de-Marne	Brie-Comte-Robert — Stade Lucien Destal
	3101	Gare de Combs-la-Ville - Quincy	Brie-Comte-Robert — Ambroise Paré
	3102	Gare de Combs-la-Ville - Quincy	Servon — Centre Commercial Eden
	3103	Gare de Gretz-Armainvilliers; Gretz-Armainvilliers — Marsange 2 Gretz-Armainvilliers — Saint-Eloi	Gare de Tournan; Tournan-en-Brie — Lycée Clément-Ader; Gretz-Armainvilliers — Collège Hutinel
	3104	Verneuil-l'Étang — Collège Charles-Péguy	Chaumes-en-Brie — Route Ferme d'Arcy; Chaumes-en-Brie — Forest Ferme
	3105	Ozoir-la-Ferrière — Collège Gérard-Philippe	Évry-Grégy-sur-Yerre — Grégy; Solers — Champs au Maigre
	3106	Brie-Comte-Robert — Collège Arthur Chaussy; Brie-Comte-Robert — Lycée Blaise Pascal	Chevry-Cossigny — Cossigny; Melun — Quai de la Courtille
	3107	Gare de Tournan; Tournan-en-Brie — Collège Vermay	Tournan-en-Brie — Maréchal Foch 3 Tournan-en-Brie — PSR; Tournan-en-Brie — Rue de Villé
	3108	Brie-Comte-Robert — Lycée Blaise Pascal	Brie-Comte-Robert — Ambroise Paré; Grisy-Suisnes — Village; Gare de Combs-la-Ville - Quincy
	3109	Gare de Tournan; Tournan-en-Brie — Lycée Clément Ader	Les Chapelles-Bourbon — Maison des Associations
	3110	Fontenay-Trésigny — Collège Mallarmé; Rozay-en-Brie — Lycée La Tour des Dames	Marles-en-Brie — Chemin des Bois; Gare de Marles-en-Brie
	3111	Gare de Gretz-Armainvilliers (circular line)	
	3112	Gare de Gretz-Armainvilliers	Gare de Tournan
	3113	Gretz-Armainvilliers — Saint-Eloi	Gare de Tournan
	3114	Brie-Comte-Robert — Lycée Blaise Pascal; Gare d'Ozoir-la-Ferrière	Lésigny — Collège Les Hyverneaux; Sevron — Mairie; Sevron — Croix Blanche
	3115	Ozoir-la-Ferrière — Lycée Lino Ventura	Gare de Tournan; Gretz-Armainvilliers — Vieux Moulin 1
	3116	Gretz-Armainvilliers — Collège Hutinel; Tournan-en-Brie — Lycée Clément-Ader	Gretz-Armainvilliers — Place Clément Ader
	3117	Gare de Marne-la-Vallée - Chessy	Guignes — Mairie
	3118	Gare de Torcy	Gare de Tournan; Tournan-en-Brie — Kipling
	3119	Gare de Tournan; Presles-en-Brie — Place de Presles	Rozay-en-Brie — Lycée La Tour des Dames; Châtres — Ikea; Marles-en-Brie — Caron; Fontenay-Trésigny — Les Bordes; Tournan-en-Brie — Lycée Clément-Ader
	3120	Gare de Verneuil-l'Étang; Chaumes-en-Brie — Eglise	Andrezel — Salle des Fêtes
	3121	Gare de Boissy-Saint-Léger	Gare de Verneuil-l'Étang
	3122	Coulommiers — Cité Scolaire	Nangis — Collège Barthélémy
	3123	Tournan-en-Brie — Lycée Clément-Ader	Argentières — Grands Saules
	3124	Rozay-en-Brie — Lycée La Tour des Dames; Mormant — Mairie; Château de Blandy	Gare de Melun; Melun — Avenue de Meaux
	3125	Coulommiers — Cité Scolaire	Fontenay-Trésigny — Rue Bertaux; Gare de Tournan
	3126	Melun — Centre Culturel; Melun — Avenue de Meaux	Brie-Comte-Robert — Salle des Fêtes; Grisy-Suisnes — Petit Grisy
	3127	Gare de Melun	Coubert — CRRA
	3128	Coulommiers — Cité Scolaire	La Chapelle-Iger — Mairie
	3129	Rozay-en-Brie — Lycée La Tour des Dames; Rozay-en-Brie — Collège Les Remparts	Bernay-Vilbert — Salle des Fêtes; La Chapelle-Iger — Mairie; La Chapelle-Iger — Les Maronniers; Clos-Fontaine — Mairie; Courpalay — Changeard; Courpalay —Grand Bréau; Courpalay — Le Lavoir; Grandpuits-Bailly-Carrois — Groupe scolaire Gastins — Mairie; Mormant — Mairie RN19; Nangis — Collège Barthélémy; Nangis — Monument aux Morts; Ozouer-le-Voulgis — Les Etards; Ozouer-le-Voulgis — Saint Victor; Pécy — Mairie; Pécy — Mélenfroy; Pécy — Mirvaux; Quiers — La Fermeté; Quiers — Les Loges; Vaudoy-en-Brie — Mairie
	3130	Gare de Tournan; Grisy-Suisnes — Petit Grisy; Coubert — CRRA	Gare de Melun
	3131	Mormant — Collège Nicolas Fouquet	Aubepierre-Ozouer-le-Repos — Bisseaux
	3132	Nangis — Lycée Henri Becqueriel	Guignes — Eglise
	3133	Gare de Marles-en-Brie	Pézarches — Station de Covoiturage
	3134	Gare de Verneuil-l'Étang	Yèbles — Eglise
	3135	Mormant — Collège Nicolas Fouquet	Andrezel — Salle des Fêtes
	3136	Mormant — Collège Nicolas Fouquet	La Chapelle-Gauthier — Rue de la Poste; La Chapelle-Gauthier — Château d'Eau
	3137	Gare de Melun	Champdeuil — Mairie; Ozouer-le-Voulgis — Les Etards; Ozouer-le-Voulgis — Saint Victor
	3138	Mormant — Collège Nicolas Fouquet	Bombon — Mairie
	3139	Rozay-en-Brie — Lycée La Tour des Dames; Rozay-en-Brie — Collège Les Remparts	La Celle-sur-Morin — Courbon; La Celle-sur-Morin — Mairie; Dammartin-sur-Tigeaux — Boulangerie; Faremoutiers — HLM; Faremoutiers — Place; Fontenay-Trésigny — Rue Bertaux; Fontenay-Trésigny — Coubertin; Fontenay-Trésigny — Lafayette; Fontenay-Trésigny — Michelet; Guerard — Chaudbuisson; Guerard — Mothérand; Guerard — Rouilly Le Bas; Hautefeuille — Les Tournelles; La Houssaye-en-Brie — Le Calvaire; La Houssaye-en-Brie Place Augereau; Lumigny-Nesles-Ormeaux — RD143; Lumigny-Nesles-Ormeaux — Nesles Château d'Eau; Marles-en-Brie — Square du Marchais; Marles-en-Brie — Croix Saint-Pierre; Pézarches — Mairie; Pézarches — Station de Covoiturage; Le Plessis-Feu-Aussoux — Camping; Touquin — Courmereau; Touquin — Mairie; Voinsles — Villeneuve La Hurée
	3140	Melun — Centre Culturel; Melun — Avenue de Meaux	Ozouer-le-Voulgis — Les Etards; Maincy — Place; Chatres — Mairie; Guignes — Les Sablons
	3141	Brie-Comte-Robert — Collège George Brassens	Brie-Comte-Robert — Ambroise Paré
	3142	Brie-Comte-Robert — Collège Arthur Chaussy	Brie-Comte-Robert — Ambroise Paré
	3143	Melun — Robert Schuman; Melun — Trois Horloges	Vaux-le-Pénil — Moustier; Crisenoy — Suscy sous Yèbles; Ozouer-le-Voulgis — Les Etards
	3144	Gare d'Ozoir-la-Ferrière	Férolles-Attilly — La Borde
	3145	Gare d'Ozoir-la-Ferrière	Ozoir-la-Ferrière — Poirier
	3146	Crèvecœur-en-Brie — Place Saint-Jean; La Houssaye-en-Brie — Bussière	Gare de Marles-en-Brie; Tournan-en-Brie — Collège Vermay
	3147	Châtres — Coffry; Liverdy-en-Brie — Briquetterie	Gare de Tournan; Tournan-en-Brie — Collège Vermay
	3148	Gare de Noisiel; Lésigny — Réveillon PLR; Lésigny — Collège Les Hyverneaux	Brie-Comte-Robert — Victor Hugo; Brie-Comte-Robert — Lycée Blaise Pascal
	7716	Gare de Lieusaint - Moissy; Brie-Comte-Robert — Rendez-Vous Château	Gare d'Ozoir-la-Ferrière

=== Night routes ===
The network is also completed with three night lines called: Soirée Ozoir-la-Ferrière, Soirée Gretz-Armainvilliers and Soirée Tournan.

Image	Line
	Soirée Gretz-Armainvilliers
	Soirée Ozoir-la-Ferrière
	Soirée Soirée Tournan

=== Demand-responsive transport ===
The network also have two demand-responsive transport services named TàD 3144 and TàD Gretz-Tournan.

Image	Line
	TàD 3144
	TàD Gretz-Tournan

== See also ==
- Île-de-France Mobilités
