= Ozoir-la-Ferrière station =

Railway station in Ozoir-la-Ferrière, France

Ozoir-la-Ferrière
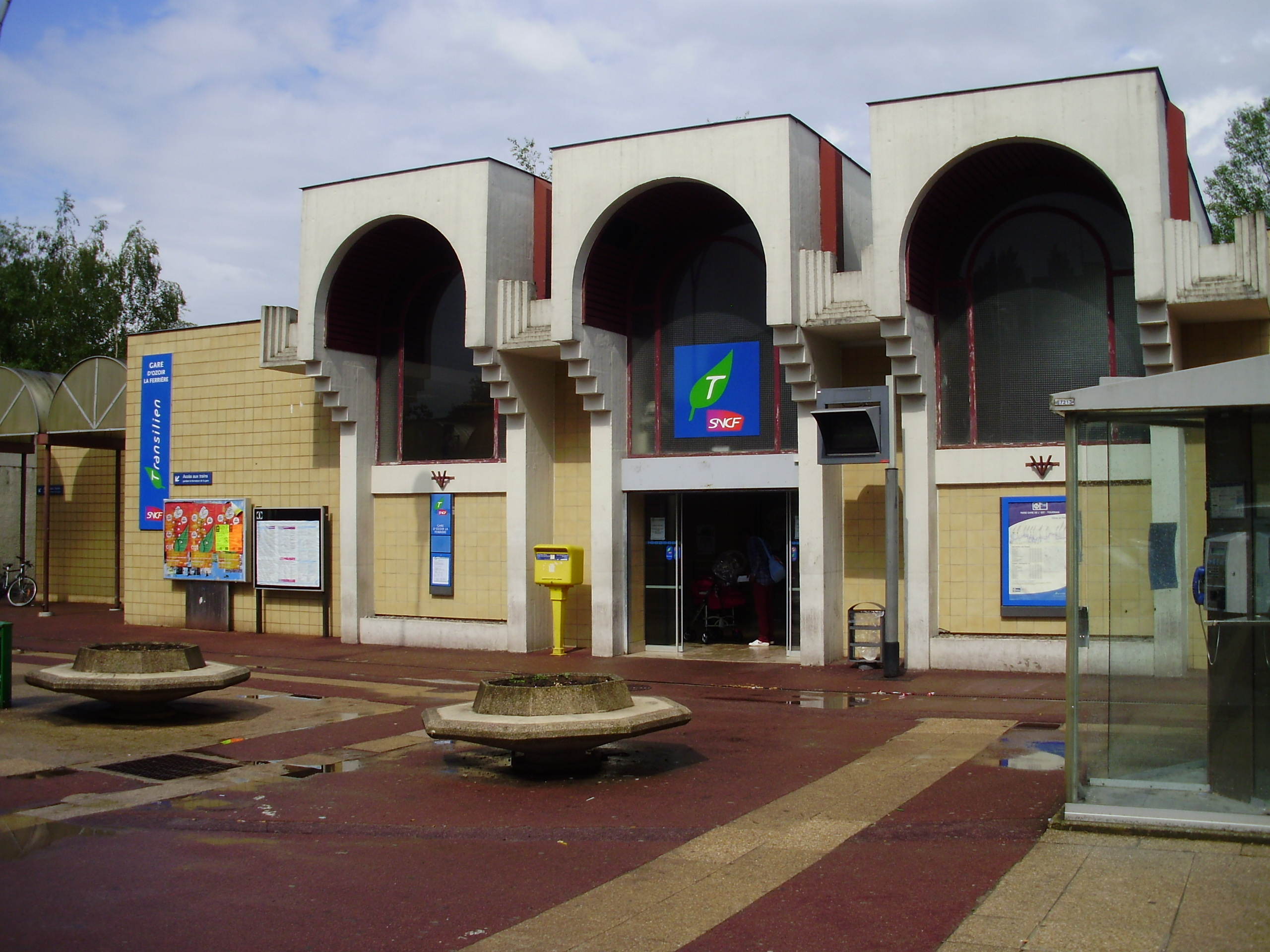
- Station entrance in 2010

General information
- Location: Place Roger-Nicolas; Ozoir-la-Ferrière; France
- Coordinates: 48.770755°N 2.690249°E
- Owner: SNCF
- Operator: SNCF
- Line: Paris-Est–Mulhouse-Ville railway
- Platforms: 2
- Tracks: 2
- Connections: Marne-la-Vallée: 2290; Pays Briard: 3114 3144 3145 7716; Noctilien: N142

Construction
- Accessible: Yes, by prior reservation

Other information
- Station code: 87116020
- Fare zone: 5

History
- Opened: 9 February 1857; 169 years ago

Passengers
- 2024: 2,061,916

Services
Preceding station	RER	Following station
Roissy-en-Brie towards Nanterre–La Folie	RER E	Gretz-Armainvilliers towards Tournan
Location

Ozoir-la-Ferrière is a French railway station in Ozoir-la-Ferrière, in the Seine-et-Marne department in the Île-de-France region. It is served by RER E.

== Location ==
The station is at kilometric point 34.207 of Paris-Est–Mulhouse-Ville railway. Its altitude is 111 m.

== History ==
The Chemins de fer de l'Est company put into service Ozoir-la-Ferrière station on 9 February 1857, as the section from Nogent–Le Perreux to Nangis opened to commercial service. The section originally opened with a single track, until a second one was put into service on 23 April. The next section, from Nangis to Flamboin, opened on 25 April 1857.

The former Ozoir station was located halfway between Roissy-en-Brie and the current station, on Roissy commune. The new station was inaugurated on 30 September 1984.

In 2000, a contract between the state and the Île-de-France region organized the expansion of the RER E from Villiers-sur-Marne to Tournan. On 14 February 2002, the STIF board of directors approved the pilot program. On 14 December 2003, the line was cut from its historical network to Paris-Est, and linked with RER E leading to Haussmann–Saint Lazare underground station. The integration modified journeys and timetables, and improved services at the station.

Platforms were raised from 0.55 meters (1.80 ft) to 0.92 meters (3.02 ft), to facilitate access to the carriages. Facilities improved accessibility to people with limited mobility. Screens on the platforms show real time information.

According to SNCF figures, in 2014, 2,143,800 passengers entered Ozoir station.

=== 2024 axe attack ===
On November 4, 2024, a violent riot with an axe caused four injuries, including two critically.

== Service ==
=== Facilities ===
The station has three exits and is accessible to disabled people. Facilities include an elevator, two automatic ticket dispensers and two help booths. It is equipped with the Infogare information display system.

=== Train service ===
Ozoir-la-Ferrière is served by RER E trains running on E4 branch, between Haussmann–Saint Lazare and Tournan. It is served by one train every 30 minutes in both directions (every 15 minutes during peak hours).

=== Connections ===
Car parks are set near the station. It is served by :

- Marne-la-Vallée: 2290
- Pays Briard: 3114 3144 3145 7716
- Noctilien night bus line N142

== See also ==
- List of stations of the Paris RER
- Paris-Est–Mulhouse-Ville railway
- RER E
