= Hôtel de Ville, Ozoir-la-Ferrière =

Town hall in Ozoir-la-Ferrière, France

Hôtel de Ville
- The main frontage of the Hôtel de Ville in September 2017
- Interactive map of the Hôtel de Ville area

General information
- Type: City hall
- Architectural style: Neoclassical style
- Location: Ozoir-la-Ferrière, France
- Coordinates: 48.7617°N 2.6720°E
- Completed: 2007

The Hôtel de Ville (French pronunciation: [otɛl də vil], City Hall) is a municipal building in Ozoir-la-Ferrière, Seine-et-Marne, in the southeastern suburbs of Paris, standing on Rue Albert Euvrard.

== History ==
The former town hall on the corner of Avenue du Général de Gaulle and Rue du Plume Vert

Following the French Revolution, the new council initially met in the home of the mayor at the time. This practice continued until 1846 when the council established a combined town hall and school close to the Church of Saint-Pierre. The classroom was on the ground floor, and the municipal offices were on the first floor.

In the late 19th century, the council led by the mayor, Eugène Alexis Arluison, decided to commission a second, more substantial combined town hall and school. The site they selected for this building was on the south side of what is now Avenue du Général de Gaulle, some 300 metres (980 ft) to the east of the original building. The new building was designed in the neoclassical style, built in rubble masonry and was completed in 1899. The design involved a symmetrical main frontage of 13 bays facing onto what is now Avenue du Général de Gaulle. The building was laid out in three parts, with the town hall in the central block, the girls' school in the left-hand wing and the boys' school in the right-hand wing. The central block featured a short flight of steps leading up to a doorway with a cornice flanked by two segmental-headed doorways. On the first floor, there were three casement windows with shutters and, at roof level, there was a clock above the central bay. The school became known as the École Arluison, named after the mayor who had commissioned it.

In the early 20th century, the council decided to commission a small, dedicated town hall. The site they selected was just to the east of the École Arluison, on the corner of Avenue du Général de Gaulle and Rue du Plume Vert. The building was designed in the neoclassical style and built in brick with a cement render finish. The design involved a symmetrical main frontage of five bays facing onto the street. The central section of three bays, which was projected forward, featured a short flight of steps leading up to a doorway with a moulded surround. The central section was fenestrated by casement windows on the ground floor and there were dormer windows at attic level. The bays were flanked by pilasters supporting a cornice. After the building was no longer required for municipal use, it served as the local Syndicat d'initiative, and later as the offices of an organisation promoting intercommunal cooperation, the Communauté de communes Les Portes Briardes Entre Villes et Forêts.

A war memorial, in the form of a stone obelisk intended to commemorate the lives of local service personnel who had died in the First World War, was unveiled on the east side of Rue Albert Euvrard, close to the town hall, in the 1920s.

In the early 21st century, following significant population growth, the council led by the mayor, Jean-François Oneto, decided to establish a more substantial town hall. The building they selected was the former school, the École Arluison, which was remodelled to suit the purpose. The conversion work involved replacing the two single storey connecting blocks between the three pavilions with glass-faced structures, and demolishing various temporary classrooms at the rear of the main building. Once the works were completed, the former school was re-opened as the town hall on 12 August 2007.
