= Canton of Ozoir-la-Ferrière =

Canton in Île-de-France, France

Coordinates: 48.76°N 2.67°E

The canton of Ozoir-la-Ferrière is an administrative division of the Seine-et-Marne department, in northern France. It was created at the French canton reorganisation which came into effect in March 2015. Its seat is in Ozoir-la-Ferrière.

It consists of the following communes:

1. Chevry-Cossigny
2. Favières
3. Férolles-Attilly
4. Ferrières-en-Brie
5. Gretz-Armainvilliers
6. Lésigny
7. Ozoir-la-Ferrière
8. Pontcarré
9. Servon
10. Tournan-en-Brie
11. Villeneuve-le-Comte
12. Villeneuve-Saint-Denis
