= Communauté de communes de l'Orée de la Brie =

Federation of municipalities in France

Coordinates: 48.69°N 2.61°E

Orée de la Brie
- Communauté de communes
- Country: France
- Region: Île-de-France
- Department: Essonne, Seine-et-Marne
- No. of communes: {{{nbcomm}}}
- Established: 1 January 2004

Government
  - President: Jean Laviolette
- Area: 49.56 km^{2} (19.14 sq mi)
- Population (2018): 27,752
  - Density: 560.0/km^{2} (1,450/sq mi)
- Website: www.loreedelabrie.fr

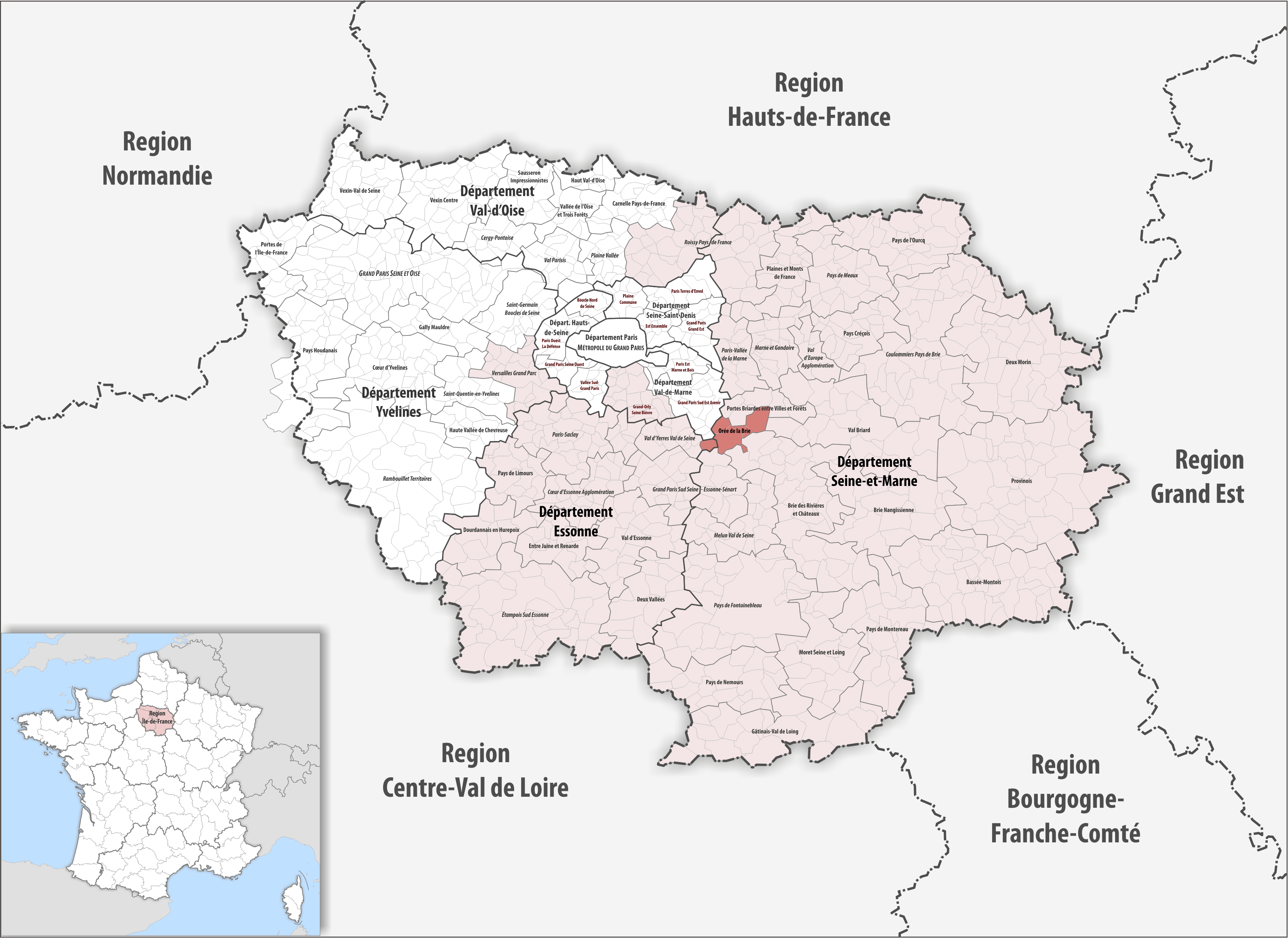

The Communauté de communes de l'Orée de la Brie is a communauté de communes in the Seine-et-Marne and Essonne departments and in the Île-de-France region of France. Its seat is Brie-Comte-Robert. Its area is 49.6 km^{2}, and its population was 27,752 in 2018.

== Composition ==
The communauté de communes consists of the following 4 communes (of which 1, Varennes-Jarcy, in Essonne):

- Brie-Comte-Robert
- Chevry-Cossigny
- Servon
- Varennes-Jarcy
