= Gretz-Armainvilliers station =

Railway station in Gretz-Armainvilliers, France

Gretz-Armainvilliers
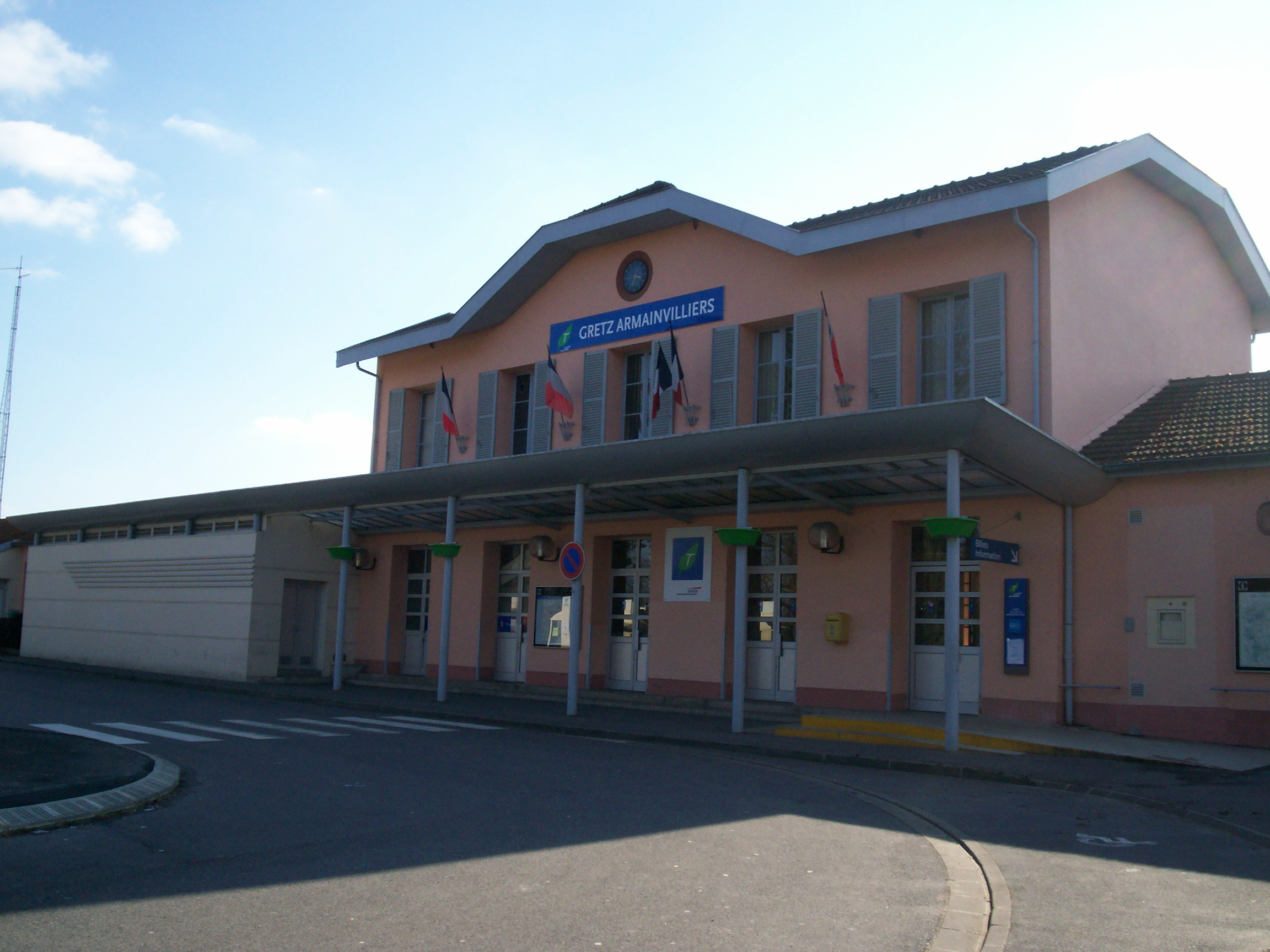
- Building of the station from the outside in 2006.

General information
- Location: Avenue de la Liberté; 77220 Gretz-Armainvilliers; France
- Coordinates: 48.745513°N 2.728152°E
- Owner: SNCF
- Operator: SNCF
- Line: Paris-Est–Mulhouse-Ville railway
- Platforms: 3
- Tracks: 3
- Connections: Pays Briard: 3103 3111 3112 3115 3118; Noctilien: N142

Construction
- Accessible: No

Other information
- Station code: 87116012
- Fare zone: 5

History
- Opened: 9 February 1857; 169 years ago

Passengers
- 2014: 907,200

Services
Preceding station	RER	Following station
Ozoir-la-Ferrière towards Nanterre–La Folie	RER E	Tournan Terminus
Location

Gretz-Armainvilliers is a French railway station located in Gretz-Armainvilliers, in the Seine-et-Marne department, in the Île-de-France region.

The station was put into service on 9 February 1857 by the Compagnie des chemins de fer de l'Est, when the section from Nogent–Le Perreux to Nangis opened. It is a SNCF station served by RER E trains.

== Location ==
The station is situated at kilometric point 38.321 of Paris-Est–Mulhouse-Ville railway, between Ozoir-la-Ferrière and Verneuil-l'Étang. Its altitude is 109 m.

== History ==
The East company puts in operation Émerainville station at the opening of the section from Nogent–Le Perreux to Nangis to commercial service. That section opens with only one track, the second is put into service on 23 April 1857.

In 2000, a contract between the State and the Île-de-France region organised the expansion of RER E from Villiers-sur-Marne to Tournan. On 14 February 2002, the STIF board of directors approves of the pilot. On 14 December 2003, the line is cut from its historical network to Paris-Est, and linked with RER E leading to Haussmann–Saint-Lazare. That integration modify journeys and timetables; it improves the station services. Platforms are raised from 0.55 metres (1.80 ft) to 0.92 metres (3.02 ft) to facilitate access to the carriages. Facilities improve accessibility to people with limited mobility. Screens on the platforms show real time information.

SNCF estimates 907,200 people frequented the station in 2014.

== Service ==
=== Facilities ===
As a Transilien network station, commercial services are available everyday, as well as facilities and assistance to people with limited mobility. The station is equipped with vending machines for Transilien and main lines tickets, and with real time traffic information system.

=== Train service ===
Gretz-Armainvilliers is served by RER E trains from or toward Tournan. The station is served in both directions by one train every 30 minutes off-peak and in the evening. It is served by two to four trains an hour during peak times.

=== Connections ===
Several car parks are set nearby.

The station is also served by bus companies:

- Pays Briard: 3103 3111 3112 3115 3118
- Noctilien night line N142
