= Varennes-Jarcy =

Commune in Île-de-France, France

- Commune
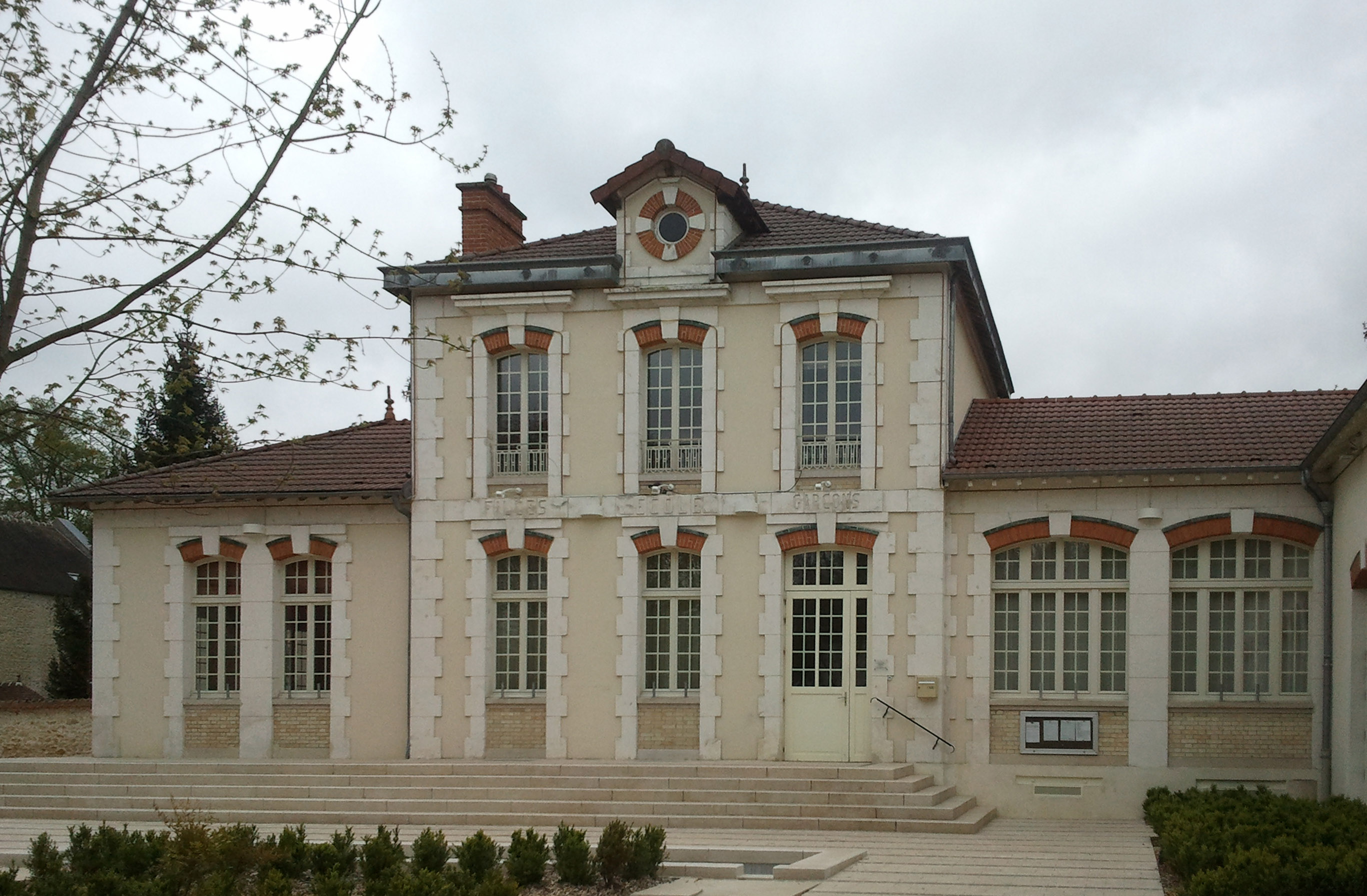
- The town hall of Varennes-Jarcy

- Coat of arms
- Location of Varennes-Jarcy
- Location within France Location within Île-de-France (region)
- Coordinates: 48°40′44″N 2°33′39″E
- Country: France
- Region: Île-de-France
- Department: Essonne
- Arrondissement: Évry
- Canton: Épinay-sous-Sénart
- Intercommunality: CC L'Orée de la Brie

Government
  - Mayor (2020–2026): Bruno Bezot
- Area^{1}: 5.48 km^{2} (2.12 sq mi)
- Highest elevation: 94 m (308 ft)
- Lowest elevation: 42 m (138 ft)
- Population (2023): 2,465
  - Density: 450/km^{2} (1,170/sq mi)
- Time zone: UTC+01:00 (CET)
  - Summer (DST): UTC+02:00 (CEST)
- INSEE/Postal code: 91631 /91480
- ^{1} French Land Register data, which excludes lakes, ponds, glaciers > 1 km^{2} (0.386 sq mi or 247 acres) and river estuaries.

Varennes-Jarcy (French pronunciation: [vaʁɛn ʒaʁsi]) is a commune in the Essonne department in northern France, located between Périgny (Val-de-Marne) and Combs-la-Ville (Seine-et-Marne) 25 km from the center of Paris.

== Population ==
Historical population
Year	Pop.	±% p.a.
1968	677	—
1975	997	+5.69%
1982	1,243	+3.20%
1990	1,687	+3.89%
1999	1,907	+1.37%
2007	2,314	+2.45%
2012	2,347	+0.28%
2017	2,310	−0.32%
2023	2,465	+1.09%
Source: INSEE

Inhabitants of Varennes-Jarcy are known as Varennois in French.

== Remarkable sites ==
Dedicated to Saint-Sulpice, bishop of Bourges, the church was built at the end of the 13th century, between 1269 and 1282. It is a large chapel with ogival vault, comprising 4 tumulary stones (tombs), which have been classified historic buildings since February 1915. They are indicated on the left and on the right entry by 2 commemorative plates. They are tombs seigneuriales:

On the left: Those of Frémin de la Sangle, died in 1492, and that of Françoise de Feugeras, his widow, who owned the properties of Varennes and Périgny.
On the right: Those of Louis de la Sangle going back to 1549, and that of his mother, the stones have become illegible today.

The church shelters also a superb white marble statue of the Blessed Virgin Mary, dated from the end of the 17th century and known under the name of MATER Dolorosa. It comes from the Abbaye de Jarcy, from where it was saved during the French Revolution and was installed there between 1792 and 1804, at the same time as the altar and the wooden sculpture of Saint Roch, dating from the 16th century.

Many alterations took place over the strands of time, as the history testifies, to some to the stained glass windows. The stained glass windows of were 13th century were installed in the abbey church during work carried out about 1652, and were reused in the church of the commune of Jarcy. In 1882, significant repairs were necessary and the stained glass was then put on sale. Monsieur Bosquillon, châtelain de Jarcy, become purchaser for 450 francs in the money of the day, but finally it was the state which, 3 years later, bought them for the sum of 600 francs, on behalf of the museum of Decorative Arts. They represent:

the tree of Jesse, dating back to 1215-1220
the miracle of Saint Martin, Bishop of Tours, dating back to 1230-1240

These two works formed the basis of a museum of the stained glass, before being stored within the Musée de Cluny. According to the statements of the Easter painter and glass maker, having restored these stained glasses in 1741, "the glare of the colors recalls the large canopies of the cathedral of Chartres, and the Gothic paintings are like those of the Sainte-Chapelle in Paris".

With the revolution, after an inventory of all the church (ornamentation, pieces of furniture) and a financial statement of the Factory, all will be wasted with the profit of the commune and the church will be transformed into "Temple de la raison". One even projected, if time allowed it, to cut down the cross of the bell-tower on December 25, 1793!

The bell dates back to 1781 and failed, like many others, being melted in 1867. Lastly, to release the village square, the old cemetery located around the church, was separated from the village in 1876: The first burial took place in 1886. On right-hand side of the entry, a stele commemorates old Varennois (inhabitants of Varenne) buried in the first cemetery since the 16th century. At the bottom is the mausoleum of the family Bosquillon de Jarcy, owner of the Domaine de Jarcy. Remainders partial of the Abbaye Royale de Jarcy.

== See also ==
- Communes of the Essonne department
