= Férolles-Attilly =

- Commune
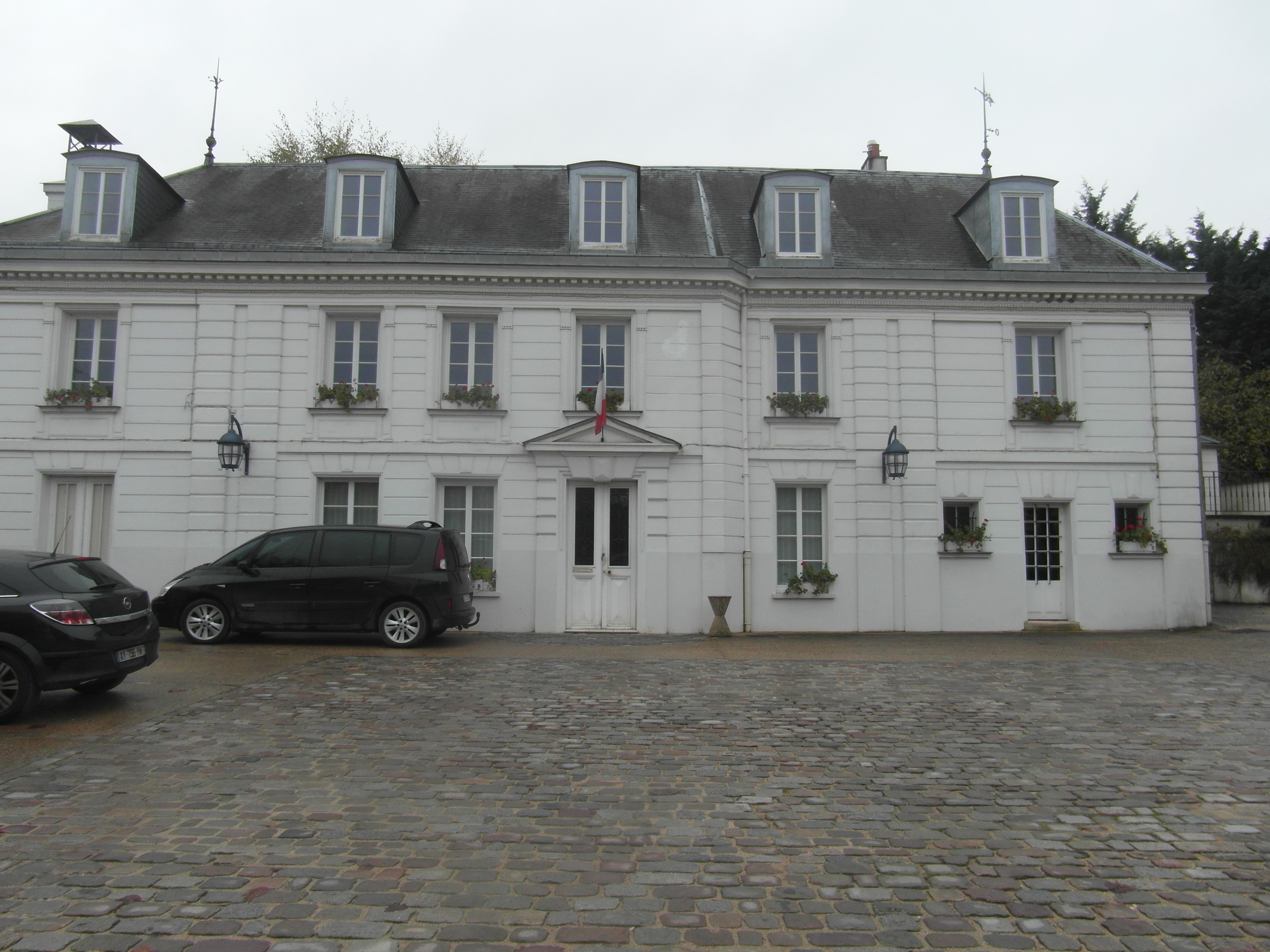
- The town hall in Férolles-Attilly

- Coat of arms
- Location of Férolles-Attilly
- Location within France Location within Île-de-France (region)
- Coordinates: 48°43′56″N 2°37′42″E
- Country: France
- Region: Île-de-France
- Department: Seine-et-Marne
- Arrondissement: Torcy
- Canton: Ozoir-la-Ferrière

Government
  - Mayor (2020–2026): Anne-Laure Fontbonne
- Area^{1}: 12.76 km^{2} (4.93 sq mi)
- Highest elevation: 107 m (351 ft)
- Lowest elevation: 72 m (236 ft)
- Population (2023): 1,248
  - Density: 97.81/km^{2} (253.3/sq mi)
- Time zone: UTC+01:00 (CET)
  - Summer (DST): UTC+02:00 (CEST)
- INSEE/Postal code: 77180 /77150
- ^{1} French Land Register data, which excludes lakes, ponds, glaciers > 1 km^{2} (0.386 sq mi or 247 acres) and river estuaries.

Férolles-Attilly (French pronunciation: [feʁɔl atiji]) is a commune in the Seine-et-Marne department in the Île-de-France region in north-central France.

== Demographics ==
Inhabitants of Férolles-Attilly are called Férollais.

== See also ==
- Communes of the Seine-et-Marne department
