= Tournan-en-Brie =

- Commune
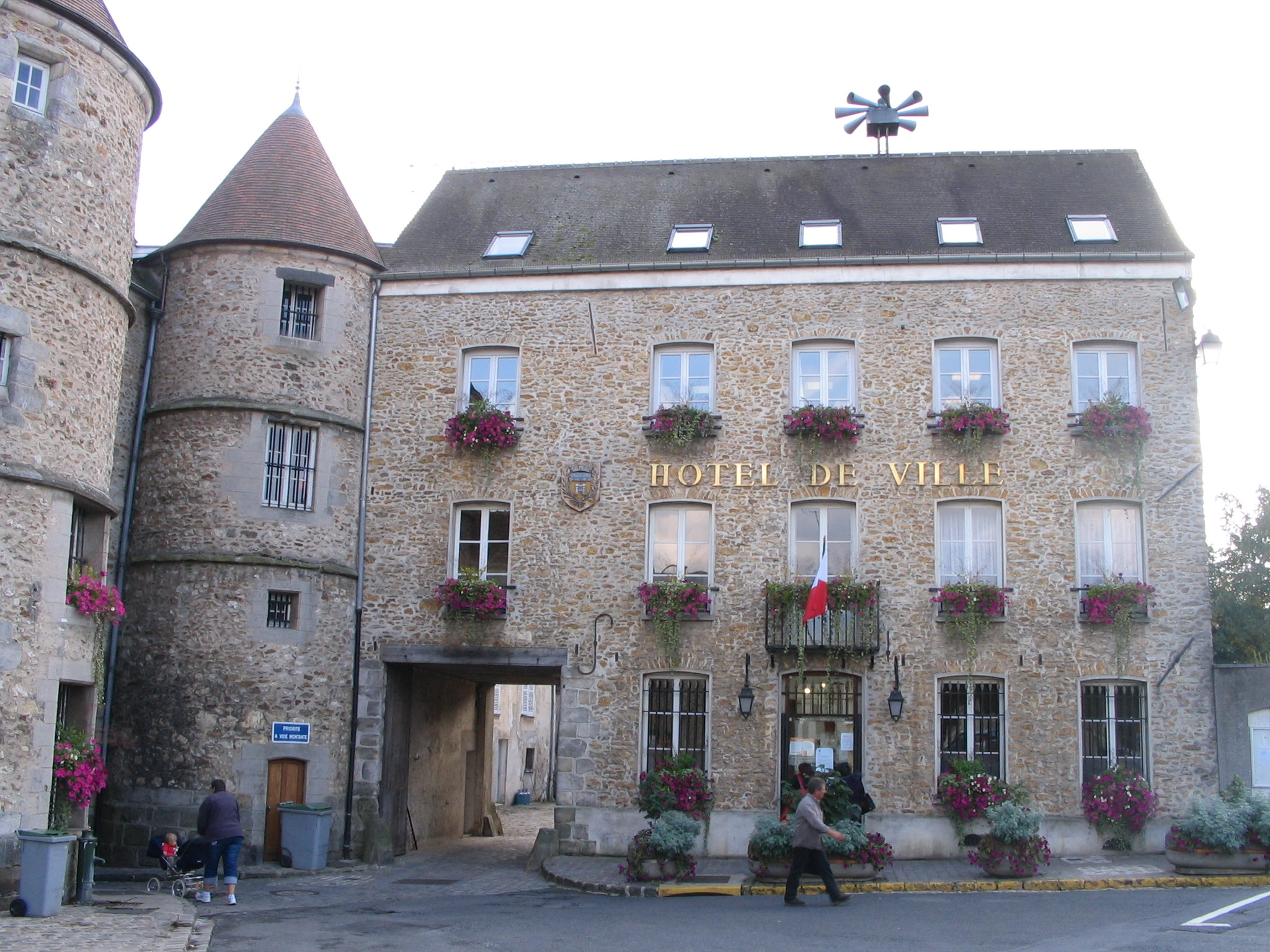
- The town hall of Tournan-en-Brie

- Coat of arms

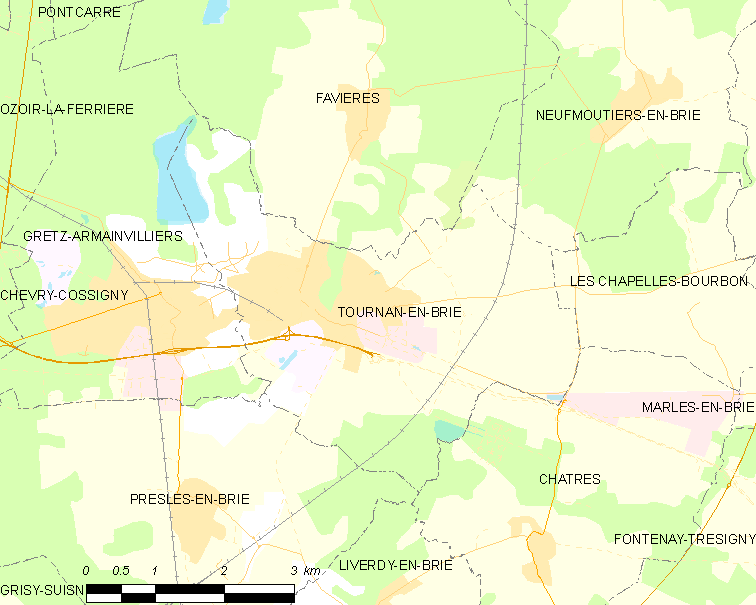
- Location of Tournan-en-Brie
- Location within France Location within Île-de-France (region)
- Coordinates: 48°44′22″N 2°46′03″E
- Country: France
- Region: Île-de-France
- Department: Seine-et-Marne
- Arrondissement: Torcy
- Canton: Ozoir-la-Ferrière
- Intercommunality: Les Portes Briardes Entre Ville et Forêts

Government
  - Mayor (2020–2026): Laurent Gautier
- Area^{1}: 15.47 km^{2} (5.97 sq mi)
- Highest elevation: 116 m (381 ft)
- Lowest elevation: 86 m (282 ft)
- Population (2023): 8,274
  - Density: 534.8/km^{2} (1,385/sq mi)
- Time zone: UTC+01:00 (CET)
  - Summer (DST): UTC+02:00 (CEST)
- INSEE/Postal code: 77470 /77220
- ^{1} French Land Register data, which excludes lakes, ponds, glaciers > 1 km^{2} (0.386 sq mi or 247 acres) and river estuaries.

Tournan-en-Brie (French pronunciation: [tuʁnɑ̃ ɑ̃ bʁi], literally Tournan in Brie), or simply Tournan, is a commune in the Seine-et-Marne department in the Île-de-France region in north-central France. It is located in the Paris metropolitan area.

== History ==
In the fourteenth century a castle was mentioned belonging to the House of Garlande, whose lords were Guy de Garlande (who still lived in 1186), Anseau Ier de Garlande (of which there is no title), Anseau II de Garlande (who lived in 1192), Robert of Garlande and Anseau III of Garlande (from 1246 to 1255). The lordship of Tournan (French: seigneur de Tournan) was purchased from Jean II de Garlande by Pierre de Chambly, chamberlain of King Philip IV, in May 1293 and yielded by him to Charles, count of Valois, in October of the same year.

== Transportation ==
Tournan station is a terminus station of the RER E (previously 'EOLE') regional railway line, connecting it to Nanterre via Magenta, Haussmann–Saint-Lazare, and La Défense. It is also a stop on Transilien line P from Gare de l'Est to Coulommiers.

== Demographics ==
Inhabitants of Tournan-en-Brie are called Tournanais in French.

Historical population
Year	Pop.	±% p.a.
1968	3,430	—
1975	5,038	+5.65%
1982	4,726	−0.91%
1990	5,528	+1.98%
1999	7,545	+3.52%
2007	8,250	+1.12%
2012	8,261	+0.03%
2017	8,718	+1.08%
2023	8,274	−0.87%
Source: INSEE

== See also ==
- Communes of the Seine-et-Marne department
