= Chevry-Cossigny =

- Commune
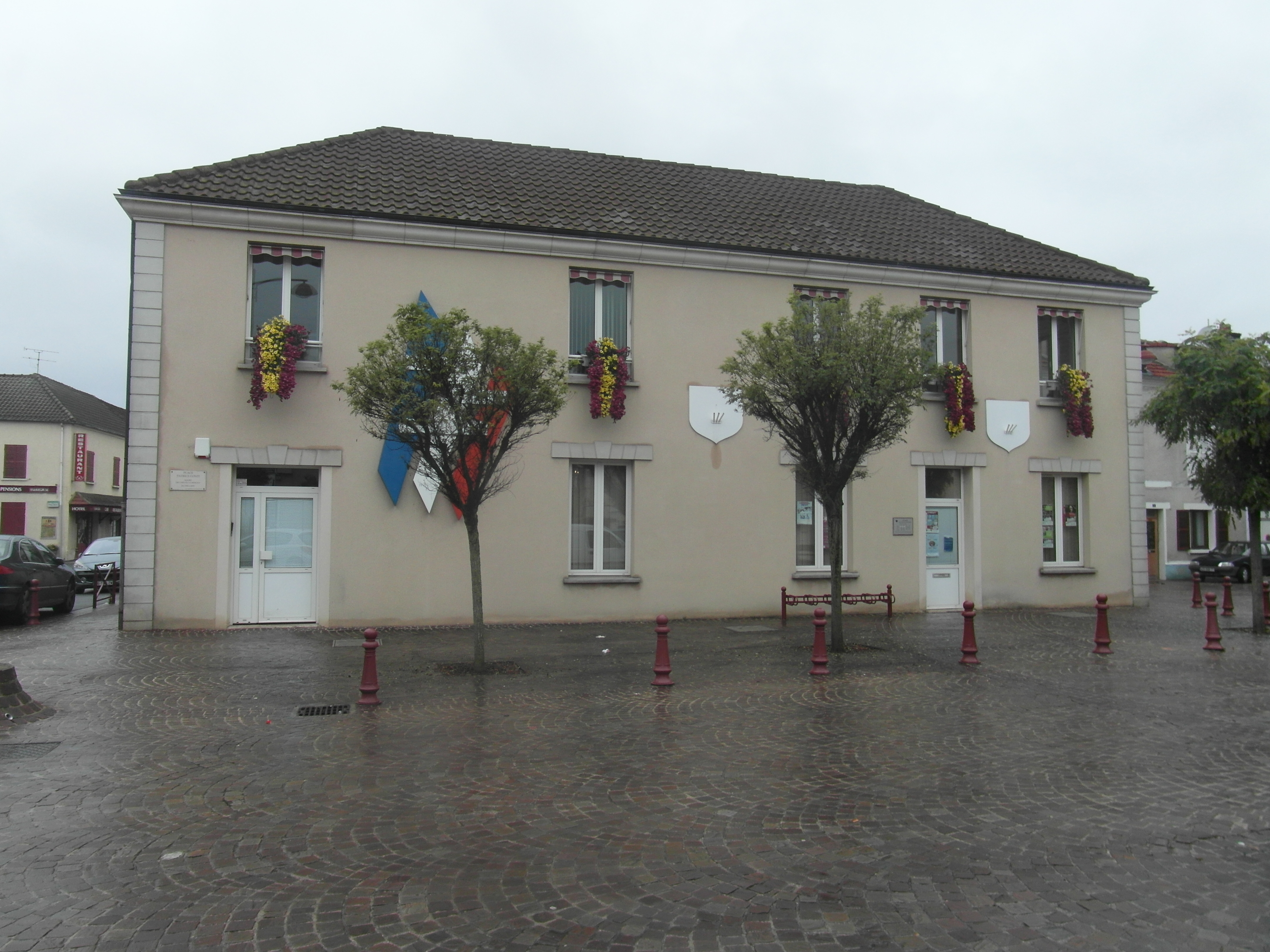
- The town hall in Chevry-Cossigny

- Coat of arms
- Location of Chevry-Cossigny
- Location within France Location within Île-de-France (region)
- Coordinates: 48°43′31″N 2°39′45″E
- Country: France
- Region: Île-de-France
- Department: Seine-et-Marne
- Arrondissement: Torcy
- Canton: Ozoir-la-Ferrière
- Intercommunality: CC L'Orée de la Brie

Government
  - Mayor (2020–2026): Jonathan Wofsy
- Area^{1}: 16.75 km^{2} (6.47 sq mi)
- Highest elevation: 108 m (354 ft)
- Lowest elevation: 93 m (305 ft)
- Population (2023): 4,075
  - Density: 243.3/km^{2} (630.1/sq mi)
- Time zone: UTC+01:00 (CET)
  - Summer (DST): UTC+02:00 (CEST)
- INSEE/Postal code: 77114 /77173
- ^{1} French Land Register data, which excludes lakes, ponds, glaciers > 1 km^{2} (0.386 sq mi or 247 acres) and river estuaries.

Chevry-Cossigny (French pronunciation: [ʃəvʁi kɔsiɲi]) is a commune in the Seine-et-Marne department in the Île-de-France region in north-central France.

== Population ==
Historical population
| Year | Pop. | ±% p.a. |
|---|---|---|
| 1968 | 970 | — |
| 1975 | 1,255 | +3.75% |
| 1982 | 1,722 | +4.62% |
| 1990 | 1,954 | +1.59% |
| 1999 | 3,315 | +6.05% |
| 2007 | 3,649 | +1.21% |
| 2012 | 3,933 | +1.51% |
| 2017 | 3,952 | +0.10% |
| 2023 | 4,075 | +0.51% |
Source: INSEE

The inhabitants are called Chevriards in French.

== Notable people ==
French film pioneer Charles Pathé was born in Chevry-Cossigny, in the year 1863.

== See also ==
- Communes of the Seine-et-Marne department
