= Tournan station =

Railway station in Tournan-en-Brie, France

Tournan
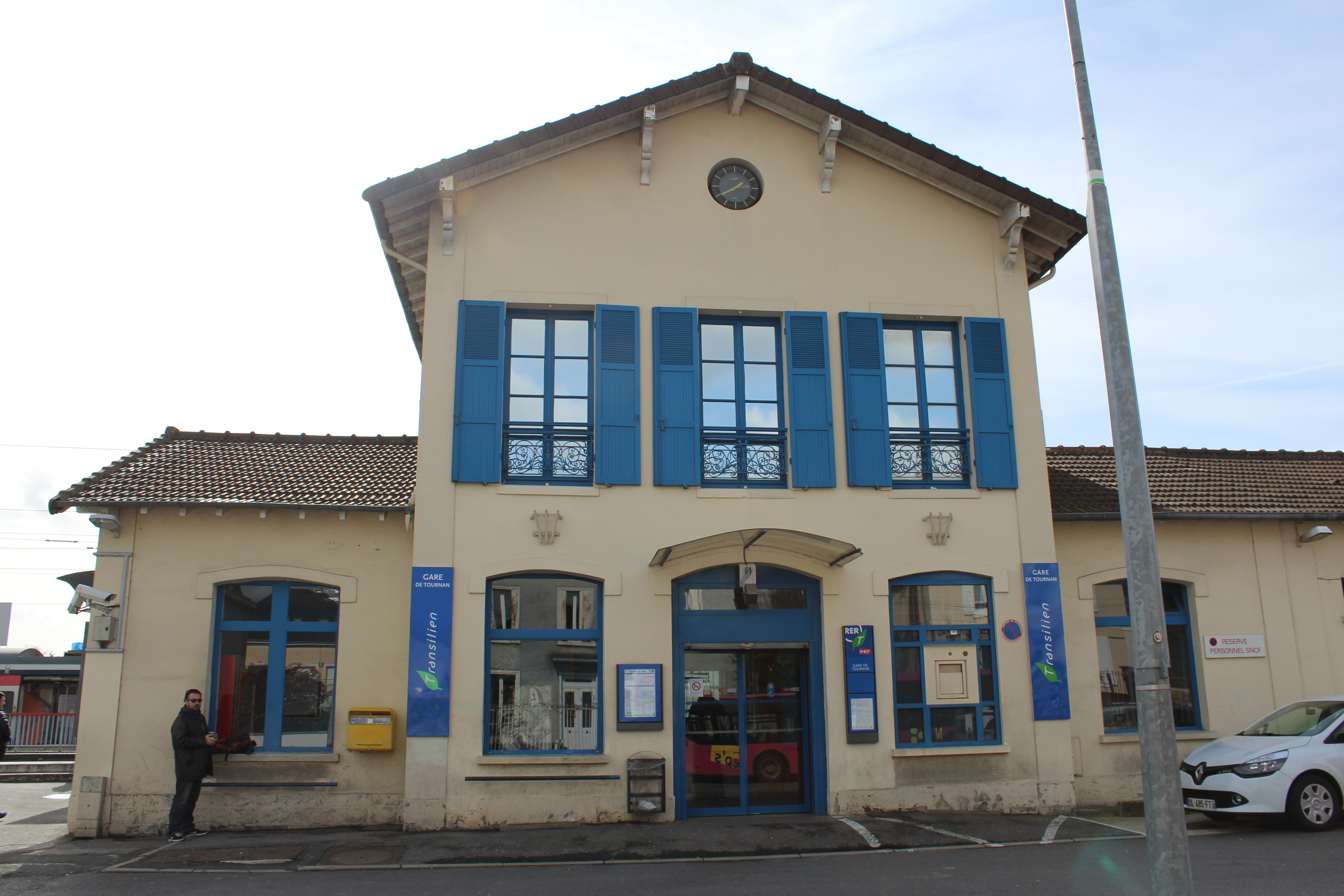
- Building of the station from the outside in 2017.

General information
- Location: 1 Rue du Général Clemenceau; Tournan-en-Brie; France
- Coordinates: 48.739345°N 2.759172°E
- Owner: SNCF
- Operator: SNCF
- Platforms: 2
- Tracks: 3
- Connections: Marne-la-Vallée: 2292; Pays Briard: 3103 3107 3109 3112 3113 3115 3116; 3118 3119 3123 3130 3146 3147; Provinois - Brie et Seine: 3214; Noctilien: N142

Construction
- Accessible: Yes, by prior reservation

Other information
- Station code: 87116210
- Fare zone: 5

History
- Opened: 2 February 1861

Passengers
- 2024: 2,507,603

Services
Preceding station	RER	Following station
Gretz-Armainvilliers towards Nanterre–La Folie	RER E	Terminus
Preceding station	Transilien	Following station
Paris-Est Terminus	Line P	Marles-en-Brie towards Coulommiers
Future services
Preceding station	Transilien	Following station
Villiers–Champigny–Bry towards Paris-Est	Line P (late 2025)	Marles-en-Brie towards Coulommiers
Location

Tournan station (French pronunciation: [tuʁnɑ̃]) is a hub in the French transport network enabling travellers to reach the region around Tournan-en-Brie (Seine-et-Marne, Ile-de-France). This place provides an easy connection to other forms of road transport. It is a railway station serving the town Tournan-en-Brie, Seine-et-Marne department, northern France. It is on the line from Gretz-Armainvilliers to Sézanne.

== See also ==
- List of Réseau Express Régional stations
- List of SNCF stations in Île-de-France
- List of Transilien stations

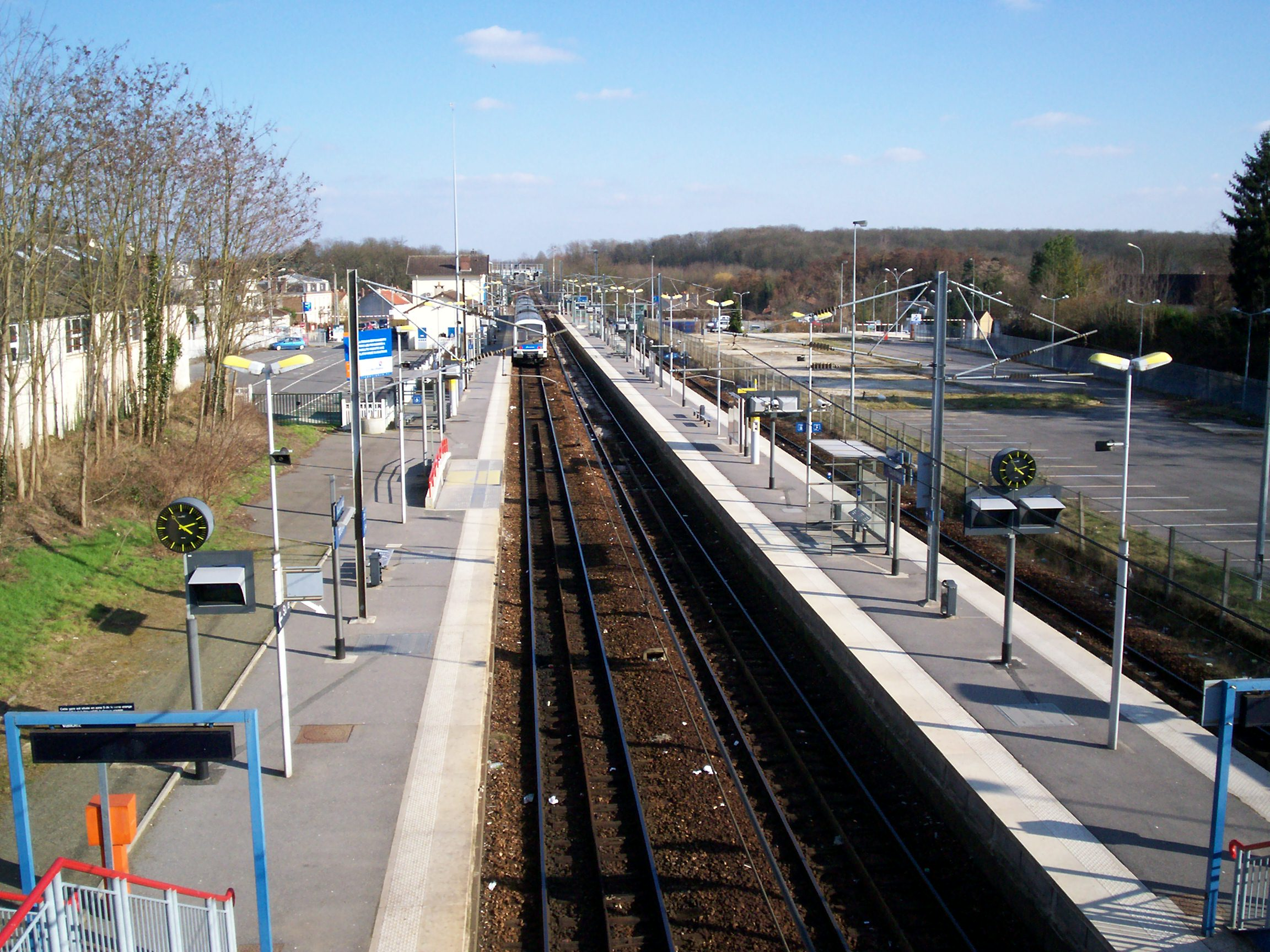
Platforms
