= Ozoir-la-Ferrière =

- Commune
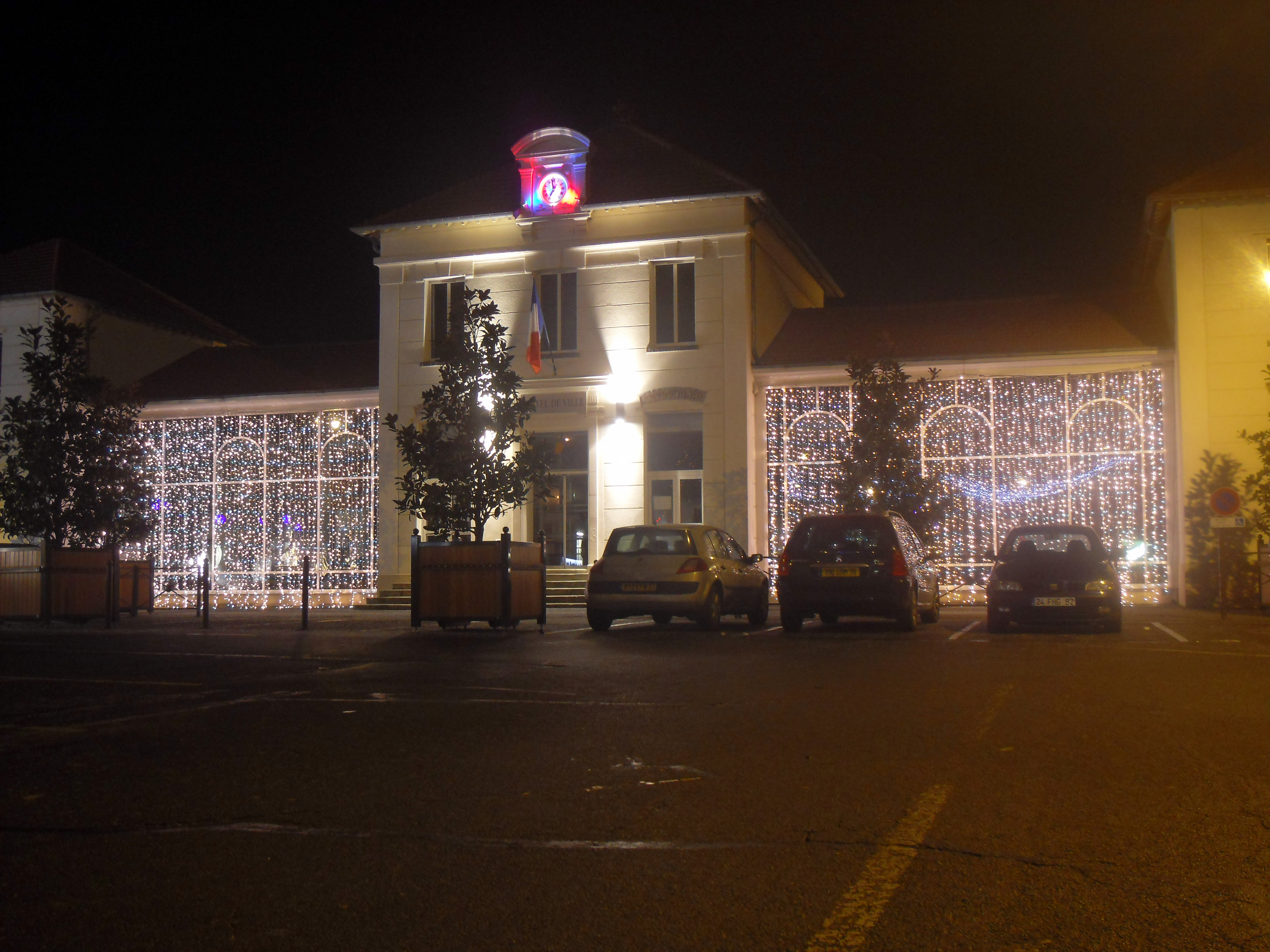
- The Hôtel de Ville

- Coat of arms

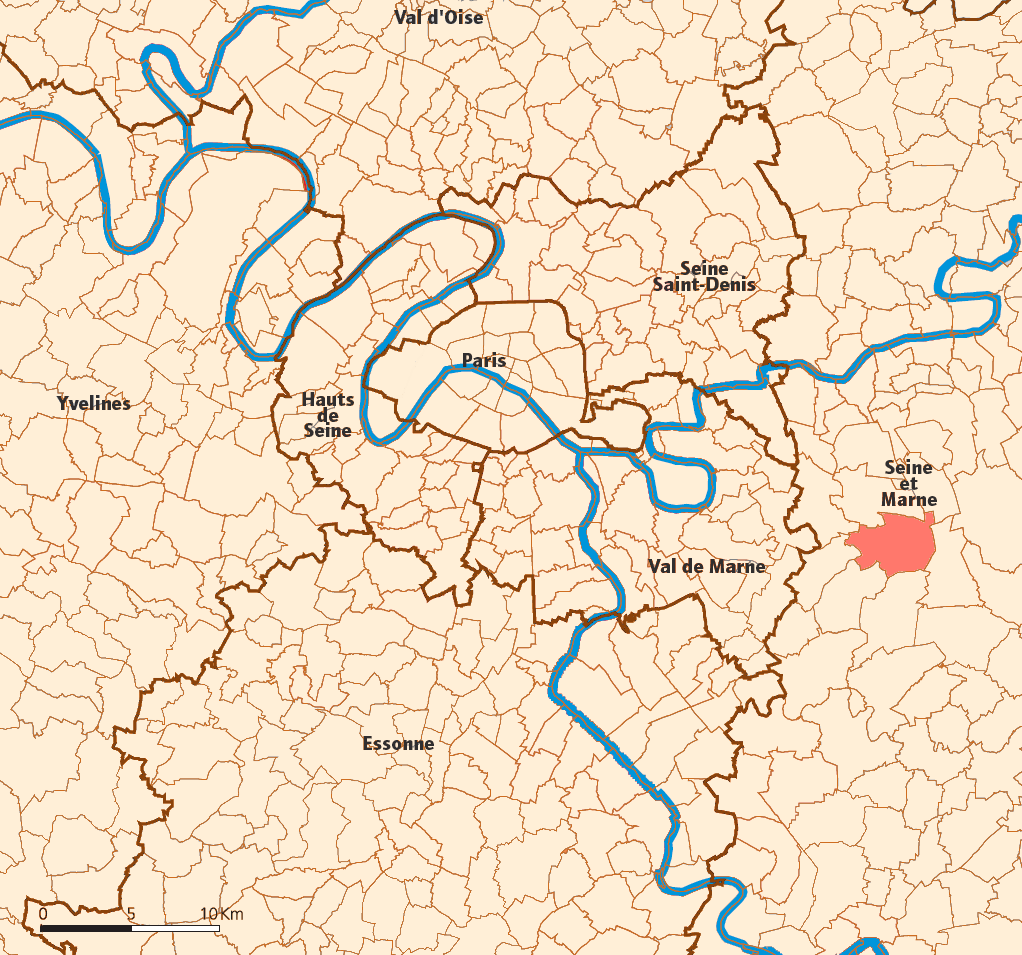
- Location (in red) within Paris inner and outer suburbs
- Location of Ozoir-la-Ferrière
- Location within France Location within Île-de-France (region)
- Coordinates: 48°46′41″N 2°40′48″E
- Country: France
- Region: Île-de-France
- Department: Seine-et-Marne
- Arrondissement: Torcy
- Canton: Ozoir-la-Ferrière
- Intercommunality: Les Portes Briardes Entre Ville et Forêts

Government
  - Mayor (2024–2026): Christine Fleck
- Area^{1}: 15.58 km^{2} (6.02 sq mi)
- Highest elevation: 122 m (400 ft)
- Lowest elevation: 94 m (308 ft)
- Population (2023): 21,238
  - Density: 1,363/km^{2} (3,531/sq mi)
- Time zone: UTC+01:00 (CET)
  - Summer (DST): UTC+02:00 (CEST)
- INSEE/Postal code: 77350 /77330
- ^{1} French Land Register data, which excludes lakes, ponds, glaciers > 1 km^{2} (0.386 sq mi or 247 acres) and river estuaries.

Ozoir-la-Ferrière (French pronunciation: [ozwaʁ la fɛʁjɛʁ]) is a commune in the Seine-et-Marne department in the Île-de-France region in north-central France. It is located in the urban area of Paris 25.6 km (15.9 mi) east-southeast from the center.

== Demographics ==
Inhabitants are called Ozoiriens or Ozophoriciens in French.

Historical population

Year	Pop.	±% p.a.
1793	576	—
1800	613	+0.89%
1806	661	+1.26%
1821	672	+0.11%
1831	644	−0.42%
1836	571	−2.38%
1841	583	+0.42%
1846	584	+0.03%
1851	608	+0.81%
1856	623	+0.49%
1861	696	+2.24%
1866	709	+0.37%
1872	665	−1.06%
1876	652	−0.49%
1881	702	+1.49%
1886	724	+0.62%
1891	751	+0.73%
1896	843	+2.34%
1901	801	−1.02%

Year	Pop.	±% p.a.
1906	851	+1.22%
1911	813	−0.91%
1921	717	−1.25%
1926	721	+0.11%
1931	1,017	+7.12%
1936	1,544	+8.71%
1946	1,550	+0.04%
1954	2,050	+3.56%
1962	3,026	+4.99%
1968	4,739	+7.76%
1975	11,778	+13.89%
1982	13,719	+2.20%
1990	19,031	+4.18%
1999	20,707	+0.94%
2007	20,202	−0.31%
2012	20,074	−0.13%
2017	20,331	+0.25%
2023	21,238	+0.73%

Source: EHESS and INSEE (1968–2023)

== History ==
During the French Revolution, Ozoir-la-Ferrière was temporarily renamed Ozoir-la-Raison, meaning "Ozoir the Reason". The Hôtel de Ville was completed in 2007.

== Transportation ==
Ozoir-la-Ferrière is served by Ozoir-la-Ferrière station on Paris RER line.

== Twin cities ==
Ozoir-la-Ferrière is twinned with Swords, County Dublin, the county town of Fingal, in eastern Ireland.

== See also ==
- Communes of the Seine-et-Marne department
