= Servon, Seine-et-Marne =

Servon
- Commune
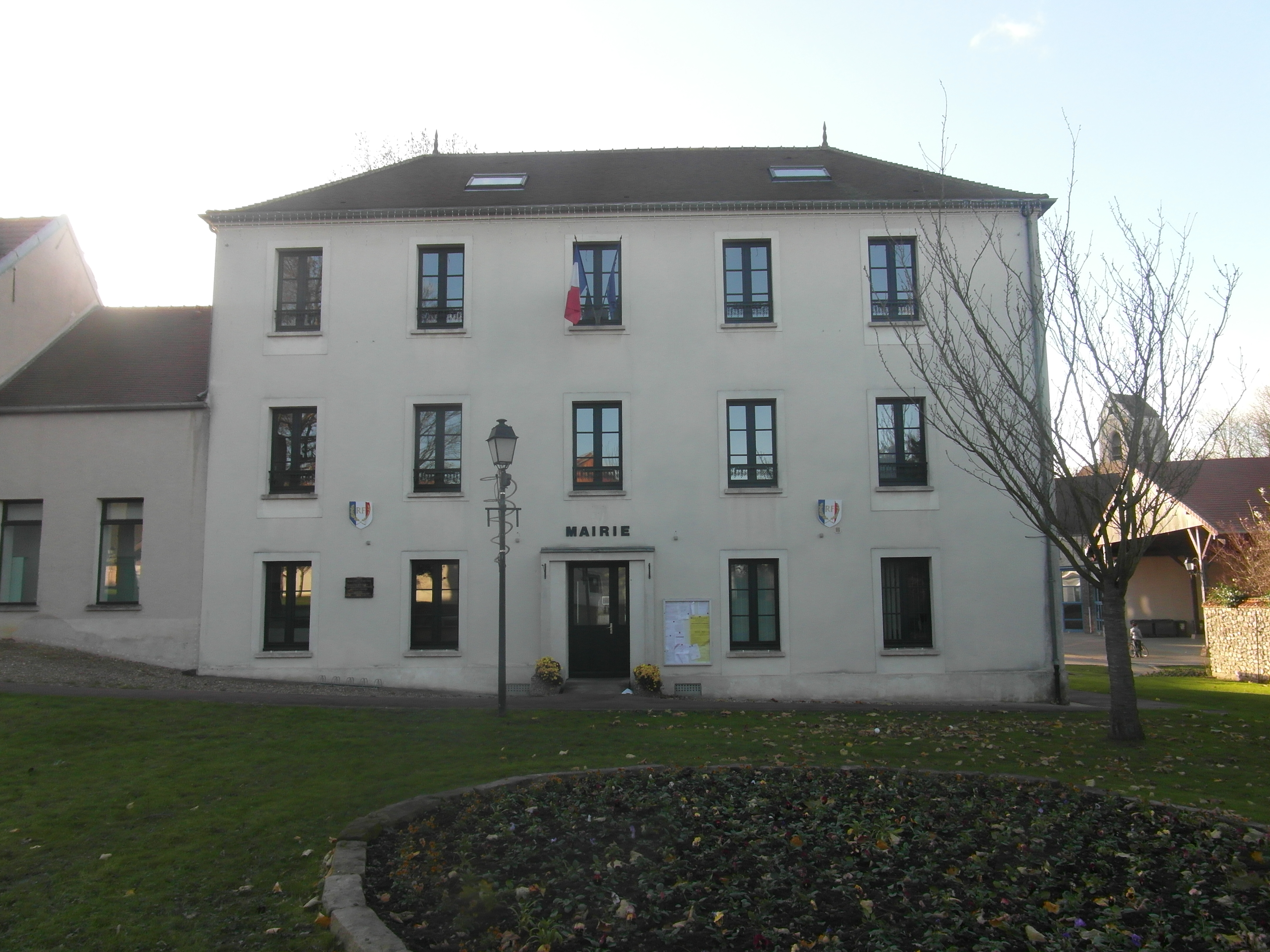
- The town hall in Servon

- Coat of arms

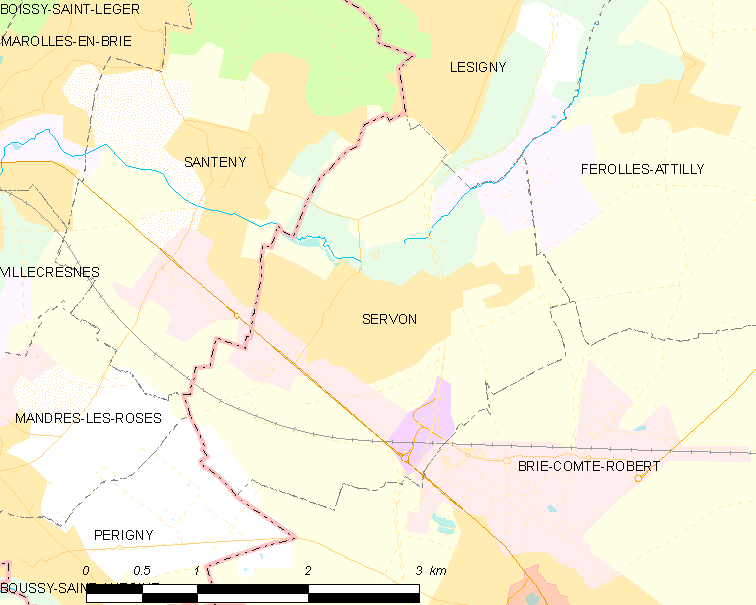
- Location of Servon
- Location within France Location within Île-de-France (region)
- Coordinates: 48°43′01″N 2°35′14″E
- Country: France
- Region: Île-de-France
- Department: Seine-et-Marne
- Arrondissement: Torcy
- Canton: Ozoir-la-Ferrière
- Intercommunality: L'Orée de la Brie

Government
  - Mayor (2020–2026): Marcel Villaça
- Area^{1}: 7.40 km^{2} (2.86 sq mi)
- Highest elevation: 97 m (318 ft)
- Lowest elevation: 65 m (213 ft)
- Population (2023): 3,565
  - Density: 482/km^{2} (1,250/sq mi)
- Time zone: UTC+01:00 (CET)
  - Summer (DST): UTC+02:00 (CEST)
- INSEE/Postal code: 77450 /77170
- ^{1} French Land Register data, which excludes lakes, ponds, glaciers > 1 km^{2} (0.386 sq mi or 247 acres) and river estuaries.

Servon (French pronunciation: [sɛʁvɔ̃]) is a commune in the Seine-et-Marne department in the Île-de-France region in north-central France.

== Population ==
Historical population
Year	Pop.	±% p.a.
1968	1,174	—
1975	1,163	−0.13%
1982	1,526	+3.96%
1990	1,924	+2.94%
1999	2,791	+4.22%
2007	2,881	+0.40%
2012	3,121	+1.61%
2017	3,251	+0.82%
2023	3,565	+1.55%
Source: INSEE

Inhabitants of Servon are called Servonnais in French.

== See also ==
- Communes of the Seine-et-Marne department
